This is a partial list of unnumbered minor planets for principal provisional designations assigned during 16–30 September 2003. Since this period yielded a high number of provisional discoveries, it is further split into several standalone pages. , a total of 483 bodies remain unnumbered for this period. Objects for this year are listed on the following pages: A–E · F–G · H–L · M–R · Si · Sii · Siii · Siv · T · Ui · Uii · Uiii · Uiv · V · Wi · Wii and X–Y. Also see previous and next year.

S 

|- id="2003 SG390" bgcolor=#fefefe
| 0 ||  || MBA-I || 18.0 || data-sort-value="0.75" | 750 m || multiple || 2000–2021 || 05 Jan 2021 || 143 || align=left | Disc.: SDSSAlt.: 2010 VD73, 2012 KW20 || 
|- id="2003 SK390" bgcolor=#d6d6d6
| 4 ||  || MBA-O || 17.8 || 1.5 km || multiple || 2003–2019 || 07 Sep 2019 || 14 || align=left | Disc.: SDSSAdded on 17 January 2021 || 
|- id="2003 SO390" bgcolor=#d6d6d6
| 0 ||  || MBA-O || 16.3 || 3.1 km || multiple || 1997–2021 || 11 Jan 2021 || 126 || align=left | Disc.: SDSS || 
|- id="2003 SP390" bgcolor=#fefefe
| 0 ||  || MBA-I || 18.75 || data-sort-value="0.53" | 530 m || multiple || 2003–2021 || 30 Nov 2021 || 98 || align=left | Disc.: SDSSAdded on 22 July 2020 || 
|- id="2003 SS390" bgcolor=#fefefe
| 0 ||  || MBA-I || 19.1 || data-sort-value="0.45" | 450 m || multiple || 2003–2020 || 14 Nov 2020 || 32 || align=left | Disc.: SDSS || 
|- id="2003 SU390" bgcolor=#fefefe
| 0 ||  || MBA-I || 18.21 || data-sort-value="0.68" | 680 m || multiple || 2003–2021 || 05 Oct 2021 || 94 || align=left | Disc.: SDSSAlt.: 2016 CW58, 2017 MJ2 || 
|- id="2003 SW390" bgcolor=#d6d6d6
| 0 ||  || MBA-O || 16.18 || 3.2 km || multiple || 2003–2022 || 27 Jan 2022 || 149 || align=left | Disc.: SDSSAlt.: 2006 FH48, 2010 CF243, 2014 TE31, 2014 UH38, 2014 UW275 || 
|- id="2003 SX390" bgcolor=#E9E9E9
| 1 ||  || MBA-M || 18.00 || 1.4 km || multiple || 2003–2021 || 29 Sep 2021 || 51 || align=left | Disc.: SDSS || 
|- id="2003 SD391" bgcolor=#FA8072
| 2 ||  || MCA || 20.2 || data-sort-value="0.27" | 270 m || multiple || 2003–2020 || 09 Oct 2020 || 23 || align=left | Disc.: SDSSAdded on 17 January 2021 || 
|- id="2003 SG391" bgcolor=#E9E9E9
| 1 ||  || MBA-M || 17.96 || 1.4 km || multiple || 2003–2021 || 10 Aug 2021 || 37 || align=left | Disc.: SDSSAdded on 21 August 2021 || 
|- id="2003 SH391" bgcolor=#d6d6d6
| 0 ||  || MBA-O || 16.53 || 2.8 km || multiple || 2001–2022 || 25 Jan 2022 || 131 || align=left | Disc.: SDSSAlt.: 2006 DA191 || 
|- id="2003 SL391" bgcolor=#d6d6d6
| 0 ||  || MBA-O || 16.7 || 2.5 km || multiple || 2003–2021 || 15 Jan 2021 || 84 || align=left | Disc.: SDSSAlt.: 2010 DZ90 || 
|- id="2003 SO391" bgcolor=#d6d6d6
| 1 ||  || MBA-O || 17.8 || 1.5 km || multiple || 2003–2019 || 05 Jul 2019 || 33 || align=left | Disc.: SDSSAlt.: 2014 WZ250 || 
|- id="2003 SP391" bgcolor=#d6d6d6
| 0 ||  || MBA-O || 16.6 || 2.7 km || multiple || 2003–2021 || 16 Jan 2021 || 123 || align=left | Disc.: SDSS || 
|- id="2003 SR391" bgcolor=#E9E9E9
| 0 ||  || MBA-M || 17.88 || 1.5 km || multiple || 2003–2021 || 04 Oct 2021 || 58 || align=left | Disc.: SDSSAlt.: 2005 EL111, 2005 EN333 || 
|- id="2003 SU391" bgcolor=#E9E9E9
| – ||  || MBA-M || 18.8 || data-sort-value="0.97" | 970 m || single || 4 days || 30 Sep 2003 || 6 || align=left | Disc.: SDSS || 
|- id="2003 SW391" bgcolor=#E9E9E9
| 0 ||  || MBA-M || 17.5 || 1.3 km || multiple || 2003–2020 || 18 Oct 2020 || 80 || align=left | Disc.: SDSS || 
|- id="2003 SC392" bgcolor=#d6d6d6
| 0 ||  || MBA-O || 16.28 || 3.1 km || multiple || 2001–2021 || 07 Apr 2021 || 265 || align=left | Disc.: SDSSAlt.: 2011 FH78 || 
|- id="2003 SD392" bgcolor=#E9E9E9
| 0 ||  || MBA-M || 17.5 || 1.3 km || multiple || 2003–2020 || 16 Nov 2020 || 106 || align=left | Disc.: SDSSAlt.: 2015 HA38 || 
|- id="2003 SF392" bgcolor=#d6d6d6
| 0 ||  || MBA-O || 17.2 || 2.0 km || multiple || 2003–2019 || 05 Nov 2019 || 54 || align=left | Disc.: SDSS || 
|- id="2003 SL392" bgcolor=#E9E9E9
| 0 ||  || MBA-M || 17.18 || 1.5 km || multiple || 2001–2022 || 26 Jan 2022 || 186 || align=left | Disc.: SDSS || 
|- id="2003 SO392" bgcolor=#d6d6d6
| 0 ||  || MBA-O || 16.0 || 3.5 km || multiple || 2003–2020 || 17 Nov 2020 || 149 || align=left | Disc.: SDSSAlt.: 2014 QH150 || 
|- id="2003 ST392" bgcolor=#d6d6d6
| 0 ||  || MBA-O || 16.3 || 3.1 km || multiple || 2001–2020 || 18 Dec 2020 || 97 || align=left | Disc.: SDSSAlt.: 2017 HQ37 || 
|- id="2003 SU392" bgcolor=#d6d6d6
| 3 ||  || MBA-O || 17.5 || 1.8 km || multiple || 2003–2019 || 02 Nov 2019 || 46 || align=left | Disc.: SDSSAlt.: 2014 WN473 || 
|- id="2003 SW392" bgcolor=#E9E9E9
| 0 ||  || MBA-M || 18.59 || data-sort-value="0.80" | 800 m || multiple || 2003–2021 || 02 Dec 2021 || 40 || align=left | Disc.: SDSSAdded on 24 December 2021 || 
|- id="2003 SX392" bgcolor=#fefefe
| 0 ||  || MBA-I || 19.0 || data-sort-value="0.47" | 470 m || multiple || 2003–2019 || 02 Nov 2019 || 71 || align=left | Disc.: SDSSAlt.: 2012 KP12 || 
|- id="2003 SY392" bgcolor=#d6d6d6
| 0 ||  || MBA-O || 16.9 || 2.3 km || multiple || 2003–2020 || 24 Jan 2020 || 53 || align=left | Disc.: SDSS || 
|- id="2003 SZ392" bgcolor=#E9E9E9
| 0 ||  || MBA-M || 17.5 || 1.3 km || multiple || 2003–2020 || 17 Sep 2020 || 83 || align=left | Disc.: SDSSAlt.: 2014 DV131 || 
|- id="2003 SB393" bgcolor=#E9E9E9
| 0 ||  || MBA-M || 17.43 || 1.8 km || multiple || 2003–2021 || 27 Nov 2021 || 135 || align=left | Disc.: SDSSAlt.: 2012 TR133, 2015 FH182, 2017 WL6 || 
|- id="2003 SD393" bgcolor=#d6d6d6
| 0 ||  || MBA-O || 17.2 || 2.0 km || multiple || 1999–2021 || 15 Mar 2021 || 42 || align=left | Disc.: SDSSAlt.: 1999 YY30, 2015 AT189 || 
|- id="2003 SE393" bgcolor=#E9E9E9
| 0 ||  || MBA-M || 17.9 || 1.1 km || multiple || 2003–2020 || 16 Jun 2020 || 48 || align=left | Disc.: SDSS || 
|- id="2003 SN393" bgcolor=#d6d6d6
| 0 ||  || MBA-O || 15.97 || 3.6 km || multiple || 2003–2021 || 23 Nov 2021 || 107 || align=left | Disc.: SDSSAlt.: 2014 QH155 || 
|- id="2003 SO393" bgcolor=#E9E9E9
| 0 ||  || MBA-M || 17.57 || 1.3 km || multiple || 2003–2022 || 08 Jan 2022 || 116 || align=left | Disc.: SDSS || 
|- id="2003 SR393" bgcolor=#fefefe
| 1 ||  || MBA-I || 19.0 || data-sort-value="0.47" | 470 m || multiple || 2003–2021 || 11 Jan 2021 || 67 || align=left | Disc.: SDSSAdded on 17 January 2021Alt.: 2020 SH22 || 
|- id="2003 ST393" bgcolor=#E9E9E9
| 1 ||  || MBA-M || 19.1 || data-sort-value="0.64" | 640 m || multiple || 2003–2020 || 20 Oct 2020 || 17 || align=left | Disc.: SDSSAdded on 17 June 2021 || 
|- id="2003 SU393" bgcolor=#d6d6d6
| – ||  || MBA-O || 18.5 || 1.1 km || single || 4 days || 30 Sep 2003 || 6 || align=left | Disc.: SDSS || 
|- id="2003 SW393" bgcolor=#E9E9E9
| 0 ||  || MBA-M || 17.4 || 1.4 km || multiple || 2003–2019 || 24 Apr 2019 || 56 || align=left | Disc.: SDSSAlt.: 2012 UN64 || 
|- id="2003 SZ393" bgcolor=#fefefe
| 1 ||  || MBA-I || 19.6 || data-sort-value="0.36" | 360 m || multiple || 2003–2020 || 15 May 2020 || 40 || align=left | Disc.: SDSSAlt.: 2010 TN135 || 
|- id="2003 SA394" bgcolor=#fefefe
| 0 ||  || MBA-I || 19.3 || data-sort-value="0.41" | 410 m || multiple || 2003–2019 || 24 Aug 2019 || 27 || align=left | Disc.: SDSS || 
|- id="2003 SH394" bgcolor=#fefefe
| 0 ||  || MBA-I || 18.5 || data-sort-value="0.59" | 590 m || multiple || 2003–2020 || 23 Nov 2020 || 71 || align=left | Disc.: SDSS || 
|- id="2003 SL394" bgcolor=#fefefe
| 0 ||  || MBA-I || 18.9 || data-sort-value="0.49" | 490 m || multiple || 2003–2020 || 16 Nov 2020 || 59 || align=left | Disc.: SDSS || 
|- id="2003 SM394" bgcolor=#fefefe
| 0 ||  || MBA-I || 18.2 || data-sort-value="0.68" | 680 m || multiple || 2003–2020 || 11 Dec 2020 || 94 || align=left | Disc.: SDSSAlt.: 2012 JH14, 2015 DT154 || 
|- id="2003 SO394" bgcolor=#fefefe
| 0 ||  || MBA-I || 18.4 || data-sort-value="0.62" | 620 m || multiple || 2003–2020 || 16 Dec 2020 || 81 || align=left | Disc.: SDSS || 
|- id="2003 SQ394" bgcolor=#fefefe
| 0 ||  || MBA-I || 19.0 || data-sort-value="0.47" | 470 m || multiple || 2003–2020 || 06 Dec 2020 || 57 || align=left | Disc.: SDSS || 
|- id="2003 SR394" bgcolor=#fefefe
| 4 ||  || MBA-I || 19.7 || data-sort-value="0.34" | 340 m || multiple || 2003–2017 || 24 Nov 2017 || 18 || align=left | Disc.: SDSS || 
|- id="2003 SV394" bgcolor=#fefefe
| 1 ||  || MBA-I || 18.5 || data-sort-value="0.59" | 590 m || multiple || 2003–2020 || 29 Jun 2020 || 33 || align=left | Disc.: SDSS || 
|- id="2003 SX394" bgcolor=#d6d6d6
| 0 ||  || MBA-O || 17.2 || 2.0 km || multiple || 2003–2021 || 07 Jun 2021 || 85 || align=left | Disc.: SDSSAdded on 17 June 2021Alt.: 2015 AK181 || 
|- id="2003 SE395" bgcolor=#fefefe
| 0 ||  || MBA-I || 18.74 || data-sort-value="0.53" | 530 m || multiple || 1994–2022 || 07 Jan 2022 || 64 || align=left | Disc.: SDSSAlt.: 2015 BD335 || 
|- id="2003 SK395" bgcolor=#fefefe
| 0 ||  || MBA-I || 17.62 || data-sort-value="0.89" | 890 m || multiple || 2002–2021 || 19 Nov 2021 || 167 || align=left | Disc.: SDSSAlt.: 2013 JO46 || 
|- id="2003 SL395" bgcolor=#d6d6d6
| 0 ||  || MBA-O || 16.4 || 2.9 km || multiple || 2003–2019 || 20 Dec 2019 || 104 || align=left | Disc.: SDSSAlt.: 2010 EZ177 || 
|- id="2003 SQ395" bgcolor=#d6d6d6
| 0 ||  || MBA-O || 17.27 || 2.0 km || multiple || 2003–2021 || 01 Jul 2021 || 56 || align=left | Disc.: SDSSAlt.: 2015 EP66 || 
|- id="2003 SS395" bgcolor=#d6d6d6
| 0 ||  || MBA-O || 16.3 || 3.1 km || multiple || 2003–2021 || 16 Jan 2021 || 119 || align=left | Disc.: SDSS || 
|- id="2003 SX395" bgcolor=#fefefe
| 0 ||  || MBA-I || 18.9 || data-sort-value="0.49" | 490 m || multiple || 2003–2020 || 14 Aug 2020 || 58 || align=left | Disc.: SDSS || 
|- id="2003 SA396" bgcolor=#E9E9E9
| 4 ||  || MBA-M || 18.6 || data-sort-value="0.80" | 800 m || single || 27 days || 23 Oct 2003 || 9 || align=left | Disc.: SDSSAdded on 29 January 2022 || 
|- id="2003 SB396" bgcolor=#fefefe
| 0 ||  || MBA-I || 18.4 || data-sort-value="0.62" | 620 m || multiple || 2003–2019 || 20 Aug 2019 || 71 || align=left | Disc.: SDSS || 
|- id="2003 SC396" bgcolor=#E9E9E9
| – ||  || MBA-M || 19.9 || data-sort-value="0.31" | 310 m || single || 2 days || 28 Sep 2003 || 6 || align=left | Disc.: SDSS || 
|- id="2003 SD396" bgcolor=#E9E9E9
| 1 ||  || MBA-M || 17.8 || 1.2 km || multiple || 2003–2020 || 20 Dec 2020 || 60 || align=left | Disc.: SDSSAdded on 17 January 2021 || 
|- id="2003 SK396" bgcolor=#E9E9E9
| 1 ||  || MBA-M || 18.52 || 1.1 km || multiple || 2003–2021 || 12 Nov 2021 || 46 || align=left | Disc.: SDSS || 
|- id="2003 SL396" bgcolor=#E9E9E9
| 0 ||  || MBA-M || 17.7 || 1.2 km || multiple || 2003–2021 || 05 Jan 2021 || 116 || align=left | Disc.: SDSS || 
|- id="2003 SM396" bgcolor=#fefefe
| 0 ||  || MBA-I || 18.32 || data-sort-value="0.64" | 640 m || multiple || 1996–2021 || 27 Nov 2021 || 116 || align=left | Disc.: SpacewatchAlt.: 1996 XL13, 2014 WW258, 2016 GW158 || 
|- id="2003 SP396" bgcolor=#E9E9E9
| 0 ||  || MBA-M || 18.1 || data-sort-value="0.71" | 710 m || multiple || 2003–2021 || 05 Jan 2021 || 52 || align=left | Disc.: SDSSAlt.: 2013 AL16 || 
|- id="2003 ST396" bgcolor=#E9E9E9
| 0 ||  || MBA-M || 17.42 || data-sort-value="0.98" | 980 m || multiple || 2003–2021 || 06 May 2021 || 184 || align=left | Disc.: SDSS || 
|- id="2003 SU396" bgcolor=#d6d6d6
| 0 ||  || MBA-O || 16.7 || 2.5 km || multiple || 2003–2020 || 23 Dec 2020 || 78 || align=left | Disc.: SDSSAlt.: 2015 AB214 || 
|- id="2003 SV396" bgcolor=#fefefe
| 0 ||  || MBA-I || 18.76 || data-sort-value="0.53" | 530 m || multiple || 2003–2021 || 19 Nov 2021 || 62 || align=left | Disc.: SDSSAlt.: 2019 AA36 || 
|- id="2003 SA397" bgcolor=#fefefe
| 0 ||  || MBA-I || 18.2 || data-sort-value="0.68" | 680 m || multiple || 2003–2020 || 08 Jul 2020 || 74 || align=left | Disc.: SDSS || 
|- id="2003 SB397" bgcolor=#d6d6d6
| 0 ||  || MBA-O || 17.0 || 2.2 km || multiple || 2003–2020 || 11 Dec 2020 || 55 || align=left | Disc.: SDSSAlt.: 2009 WK242 || 
|- id="2003 SC397" bgcolor=#fefefe
| – ||  || MBA-I || 20.1 || data-sort-value="0.28" | 280 m || single || 2 days || 28 Sep 2003 || 6 || align=left | Disc.: SDSS || 
|- id="2003 SG397" bgcolor=#E9E9E9
| 2 ||  || MBA-M || 19.3 || data-sort-value="0.58" | 580 m || multiple || 2003–2016 || 27 Oct 2016 || 15 || align=left | Disc.: SDSSAdded on 29 January 2022 || 
|- id="2003 SH397" bgcolor=#E9E9E9
| 1 ||  || MBA-M || 18.1 || data-sort-value="0.71" | 710 m || multiple || 2003–2015 || 16 Oct 2015 || 42 || align=left | Disc.: SDSSAlt.: 2015 PW20 || 
|- id="2003 SL397" bgcolor=#fefefe
| 4 ||  || MBA-I || 19.5 || data-sort-value="0.37" | 370 m || multiple || 2003–2021 || 13 Nov 2021 || 14 || align=left | Disc.: SDSS || 
|- id="2003 SM397" bgcolor=#E9E9E9
| 0 ||  || MBA-M || 17.09 || 2.1 km || multiple || 2003–2021 || 06 Nov 2021 || 142 || align=left | Disc.: SDSSAlt.: 2011 HS48 || 
|- id="2003 SO397" bgcolor=#d6d6d6
| 0 ||  || MBA-O || 16.45 || 2.9 km || multiple || 2000–2022 || 24 Jan 2022 || 160 || align=left | Disc.: SDSSAlt.: 2011 CS21 || 
|- id="2003 SP397" bgcolor=#E9E9E9
| 0 ||  || MBA-M || 18.26 || 1.2 km || multiple || 2003–2021 || 08 Aug 2021 || 53 || align=left | Disc.: SDSSAlt.: 2017 OJ67 || 
|- id="2003 SQ397" bgcolor=#fefefe
| 1 ||  || MBA-I || 18.46 || data-sort-value="0.60" | 600 m || multiple || 2003–2021 || 03 Oct 2021 || 55 || align=left | Disc.: SDSSAlt.: 2021 NQ41 || 
|- id="2003 SV397" bgcolor=#E9E9E9
| 0 ||  || MBA-M || 17.59 || 1.7 km || multiple || 2003–2021 || 06 Nov 2021 || 80 || align=left | Disc.: SDSSAdded on 17 January 2021Alt.: 2017 VW43 || 
|- id="2003 SX397" bgcolor=#E9E9E9
| 1 ||  || MBA-M || 18.3 || data-sort-value="0.65" | 650 m || multiple || 2003–2019 || 04 Oct 2019 || 39 || align=left | Disc.: SDSS || 
|- id="2003 SY397" bgcolor=#d6d6d6
| 0 ||  || MBA-O || 16.79 || 2.4 km || multiple || 2003–2022 || 09 Jan 2022 || 95 || align=left | Disc.: SDSSAlt.: 2014 QY199 || 
|- id="2003 SZ397" bgcolor=#d6d6d6
| 0 ||  || MBA-O || 16.3 || 3.1 km || multiple || 2003–2021 || 18 Jan 2021 || 116 || align=left | Disc.: SDSS || 
|- id="2003 SA398" bgcolor=#fefefe
| 1 ||  || MBA-I || 18.4 || data-sort-value="0.62" | 620 m || multiple || 2003–2016 || 01 May 2016 || 24 || align=left | Disc.: SDSS || 
|- id="2003 SB398" bgcolor=#d6d6d6
| 0 ||  || MBA-O || 16.5 || 2.8 km || multiple || 2003–2019 || 15 Nov 2019 || 93 || align=left | Disc.: SDSSAlt.: 2010 FP123 || 
|- id="2003 SC398" bgcolor=#d6d6d6
| 0 ||  || MBA-O || 17.2 || 2.0 km || multiple || 2003–2021 || 18 Jan 2021 || 50 || align=left | Disc.: SDSSAlt.: 2014 WM327 || 
|- id="2003 SJ398" bgcolor=#d6d6d6
| 0 ||  || MBA-O || 16.9 || 2.3 km || multiple || 2003–2020 || 11 Dec 2020 || 39 || align=left | Disc.: SDSSAdded on 17 January 2021 || 
|- id="2003 SL398" bgcolor=#d6d6d6
| 0 ||  || HIL || 16.0 || 3.5 km || multiple || 2003–2019 || 20 Dec 2019 || 68 || align=left | Disc.: SDSS || 
|- id="2003 SM398" bgcolor=#E9E9E9
| 0 ||  || MBA-M || 17.0 || 2.2 km || multiple || 2003–2021 || 25 Nov 2021 || 68 || align=left | Disc.: SDSS || 
|- id="2003 SN398" bgcolor=#E9E9E9
| 0 ||  || MBA-M || 18.12 || 1.3 km || multiple || 2003–2021 || 28 Nov 2021 || 70 || align=left | Disc.: SDSSAdded on 5 November 2021 || 
|- id="2003 SS398" bgcolor=#fefefe
| 0 ||  || MBA-I || 19.5 || data-sort-value="0.37" | 370 m || multiple || 2003–2016 || 30 Sep 2016 || 19 || align=left | Disc.: SDSS || 
|- id="2003 ST398" bgcolor=#fefefe
| 0 ||  || MBA-I || 18.3 || data-sort-value="0.65" | 650 m || multiple || 2003–2020 || 16 Nov 2020 || 61 || align=left | Disc.: SDSS || 
|- id="2003 SU398" bgcolor=#d6d6d6
| 0 ||  || MBA-O || 16.52 || 2.8 km || multiple || 2003–2022 || 24 Jan 2022 || 139 || align=left | Disc.: SDSS || 
|- id="2003 SB399" bgcolor=#E9E9E9
| 0 ||  || MBA-M || 17.23 || 2.0 km || multiple || 2003–2021 || 02 Dec 2021 || 81 || align=left | Disc.: SDSS || 
|- id="2003 SG399" bgcolor=#d6d6d6
| 2 ||  || MBA-O || 17.9 || 1.5 km || multiple || 2003–2019 || 26 Sep 2019 || 18 || align=left | Disc.: SDSS || 
|- id="2003 SL399" bgcolor=#E9E9E9
| 0 ||  || MBA-M || 17.5 || data-sort-value="0.94" | 940 m || multiple || 2003–2021 || 09 Jan 2021 || 94 || align=left | Disc.: SDSSAlt.: 2011 QR || 
|- id="2003 SQ399" bgcolor=#fefefe
| 0 ||  || MBA-I || 18.7 || data-sort-value="0.54" | 540 m || multiple || 2003–2020 || 16 Nov 2020 || 68 || align=left | Disc.: SDSS || 
|- id="2003 SS399" bgcolor=#E9E9E9
| 0 ||  || MBA-M || 17.1 || 1.1 km || multiple || 2003–2021 || 01 Jun 2021 || 152 || align=left | Disc.: SDSS || 
|- id="2003 SU399" bgcolor=#fefefe
| – ||  || MBA-I || 19.6 || data-sort-value="0.36" | 360 m || single || 2 days || 28 Sep 2003 || 6 || align=left | Disc.: SDSS || 
|- id="2003 SX399" bgcolor=#E9E9E9
| 0 ||  || MBA-M || 17.70 || 1.6 km || multiple || 2003–2022 || 05 Jan 2022 || 84 || align=left | Disc.: SDSS || 
|- id="2003 SA400" bgcolor=#E9E9E9
| 0 ||  || MBA-M || 17.2 || 1.5 km || multiple || 2002–2020 || 08 Nov 2020 || 115 || align=left | Disc.: SDSSAlt.: 2015 MA43 || 
|- id="2003 SC400" bgcolor=#d6d6d6
| 0 ||  || MBA-O || 17.0 || 2.2 km || multiple || 2003–2020 || 21 Jan 2020 || 41 || align=left | Disc.: SDSS || 
|- id="2003 SG400" bgcolor=#E9E9E9
| 0 ||  || MBA-M || 17.7 || 1.6 km || multiple || 2003–2021 || 02 Dec 2021 || 43 || align=left | Disc.: SDSSAdded on 24 December 2021 || 
|- id="2003 SH400" bgcolor=#E9E9E9
| 2 ||  || MBA-M || 18.2 || data-sort-value="0.68" | 680 m || multiple || 2003–2019 || 31 Oct 2019 || 42 || align=left | Disc.: SDSS || 
|- id="2003 SJ400" bgcolor=#E9E9E9
| 0 ||  || MBA-M || 16.91 || 2.3 km || multiple || 2003–2021 || 09 Sep 2021 || 71 || align=left | Disc.: SDSS || 
|- id="2003 SM400" bgcolor=#E9E9E9
| 0 ||  || MBA-M || 17.16 || 1.6 km || multiple || 1996–2022 || 25 Jan 2022 || 133 || align=left | Disc.: NRCAlt.: 1996 BJ18 || 
|- id="2003 SO400" bgcolor=#d6d6d6
| 0 ||  || MBA-O || 16.1 || 3.4 km || multiple || 2003–2021 || 08 Jan 2021 || 169 || align=left | Disc.: SDSS || 
|- id="2003 SW400" bgcolor=#fefefe
| 0 ||  || MBA-I || 18.6 || data-sort-value="0.57" | 570 m || multiple || 2003–2019 || 03 Jun 2019 || 89 || align=left | Disc.: SDSS || 
|- id="2003 SX400" bgcolor=#fefefe
| – ||  || MBA-I || 18.5 || data-sort-value="0.59" | 590 m || single || 4 days || 30 Sep 2003 || 6 || align=left | Disc.: SDSS || 
|- id="2003 SB401" bgcolor=#fefefe
| 0 ||  || MBA-I || 18.7 || data-sort-value="0.54" | 540 m || multiple || 2003–2018 || 06 Oct 2018 || 38 || align=left | Disc.: SDSS || 
|- id="2003 SD401" bgcolor=#E9E9E9
| 0 ||  || MBA-M || 17.2 || 1.1 km || multiple || 2003–2019 || 12 Aug 2019 || 81 || align=left | Disc.: SDSSAlt.: 2010 LA36, 2015 VF4 || 
|- id="2003 SE401" bgcolor=#E9E9E9
| 0 ||  || MBA-M || 17.30 || 1.0 km || multiple || 1999–2022 || 26 Jan 2022 || 121 || align=left | Disc.: SDSSAlt.: 2014 DO70 || 
|- id="2003 SF401" bgcolor=#d6d6d6
| 0 ||  || MBA-O || 16.82 || 2.4 km || multiple || 2003–2021 || 08 Aug 2021 || 109 || align=left | Disc.: SDSSAlt.: 2015 DY123 || 
|- id="2003 SN401" bgcolor=#d6d6d6
| 0 ||  || MBA-O || 16.92 || 2.3 km || multiple || 2003–2022 || 26 Jan 2022 || 76 || align=left | Disc.: SDSSAlt.: 2014 SB181 || 
|- id="2003 SP401" bgcolor=#E9E9E9
| 0 ||  || MBA-M || 17.8 || 1.2 km || multiple || 2003–2020 || 11 Dec 2020 || 59 || align=left | Disc.: SDSSAdded on 17 January 2021 || 
|- id="2003 SR401" bgcolor=#E9E9E9
| 1 ||  || MBA-M || 17.9 || 1.1 km || multiple || 2003–2020 || 20 Nov 2020 || 43 || align=left | Disc.: SDSS || 
|- id="2003 ST401" bgcolor=#d6d6d6
| 0 ||  || MBA-O || 17.16 || 2.1 km || multiple || 2003–2021 || 10 Apr 2021 || 87 || align=left | Disc.: SDSS || 
|- id="2003 SV401" bgcolor=#fefefe
| 1 ||  || MBA-I || 18.5 || data-sort-value="0.59" | 590 m || multiple || 2003–2018 || 05 Aug 2018 || 28 || align=left | Disc.: SDSS || 
|- id="2003 SA402" bgcolor=#E9E9E9
| 2 ||  || MBA-M || 17.9 || 1.5 km || multiple || 2003–2017 || 11 Dec 2017 || 54 || align=left | Disc.: SDSSAlt.: 2017 UD50 || 
|- id="2003 SD402" bgcolor=#fefefe
| 0 ||  || HUN || 19.02 || data-sort-value="0.47" | 470 m || multiple || 2003–2021 || 01 Dec 2021 || 47 || align=left | Disc.: SDSSAlt.: 2020 HW27 || 
|- id="2003 SE402" bgcolor=#d6d6d6
| – ||  || MBA-O || 17.5 || 1.8 km || single || 4 days || 30 Sep 2003 || 6 || align=left | Disc.: SDSS || 
|- id="2003 SK402" bgcolor=#E9E9E9
| 0 ||  || MBA-M || 17.51 || 1.3 km || multiple || 2003–2022 || 25 Jan 2022 || 48 || align=left | Disc.: SDSSAdded on 19 October 2020 || 
|- id="2003 SL402" bgcolor=#d6d6d6
| 0 ||  || MBA-O || 17.3 || 1.9 km || multiple || 2003–2019 || 25 Sep 2019 || 36 || align=left | Disc.: SDSSAdded on 21 August 2021Alt.: 2010 GJ197 || 
|- id="2003 SN402" bgcolor=#E9E9E9
| 0 ||  || MBA-M || 17.0 || 1.7 km || multiple || 2002–2020 || 17 Nov 2020 || 121 || align=left | Disc.: SDSS || 
|- id="2003 SP402" bgcolor=#E9E9E9
| 3 ||  || MBA-M || 18.0 || 1.4 km || multiple || 2003–2017 || 23 Oct 2017 || 20 || align=left | Disc.: Spacewatch || 
|- id="2003 SU402" bgcolor=#d6d6d6
| – ||  || MBA-O || 18.5 || 1.1 km || single || 2 days || 29 Sep 2003 || 6 || align=left | Disc.: Spacewatch || 
|- id="2003 SV402" bgcolor=#E9E9E9
| 0 ||  || MBA-M || 17.21 || 2.0 km || multiple || 2001–2021 || 04 Aug 2021 || 113 || align=left | Disc.: SpacewatchAlt.: 2015 FJ200 || 
|- id="2003 SY402" bgcolor=#E9E9E9
| 1 ||  || MBA-M || 18.22 || data-sort-value="0.67" | 670 m || multiple || 2003–2019 || 07 Aug 2019 || 37 || align=left | Disc.: Spacewatch || 
|- id="2003 SA403" bgcolor=#fefefe
| 0 ||  || MBA-I || 18.3 || data-sort-value="0.65" | 650 m || multiple || 2003–2020 || 17 Oct 2020 || 123 || align=left | Disc.: Spacewatch || 
|- id="2003 SC403" bgcolor=#E9E9E9
| 1 ||  || MBA-M || 18.5 || data-sort-value="0.84" | 840 m || multiple || 2003–2020 || 11 Oct 2020 || 44 || align=left | Disc.: Spacewatch || 
|- id="2003 SD403" bgcolor=#fefefe
| 0 ||  || MBA-I || 19.26 || data-sort-value="0.42" | 420 m || multiple || 2003–2021 || 07 Sep 2021 || 43 || align=left | Disc.: Spacewatch || 
|- id="2003 SG403" bgcolor=#d6d6d6
| 0 ||  || MBA-O || 16.8 || 2.4 km || multiple || 2003–2021 || 12 Jan 2021 || 79 || align=left | Disc.: Spacewatch || 
|- id="2003 SH403" bgcolor=#d6d6d6
| 0 ||  || MBA-O || 17.82 || 1.5 km || multiple || 2003–2022 || 25 Jan 2022 || 63 || align=left | Disc.: SDSSAlt.: 2003 SW422 || 
|- id="2003 SJ403" bgcolor=#E9E9E9
| 1 ||  || MBA-M || 18.5 || data-sort-value="0.59" | 590 m || multiple || 1999–2019 || 24 Oct 2019 || 64 || align=left | Disc.: Spacewatch || 
|- id="2003 SN403" bgcolor=#d6d6d6
| 0 ||  || MBA-O || 16.6 || 2.7 km || multiple || 2003–2021 || 12 Jan 2021 || 111 || align=left | Disc.: Spacewatch || 
|- id="2003 SO403" bgcolor=#FA8072
| 0 ||  || MCA || 18.77 || data-sort-value="0.52" | 520 m || multiple || 2003–2020 || 12 Jul 2020 || 65 || align=left | Disc.: SpacewatchAlt.: 2017 SU10 || 
|- id="2003 SW403" bgcolor=#d6d6d6
| 0 ||  || MBA-O || 16.2 || 3.2 km || multiple || 2003–2021 || 08 Jan 2021 || 158 || align=left | Disc.: SDSS || 
|- id="2003 SD404" bgcolor=#d6d6d6
| 0 ||  || MBA-O || 16.2 || 3.2 km || multiple || 2003–2020 || 08 Dec 2020 || 83 || align=left | Disc.: SDSSAlt.: 2015 XV121 || 
|- id="2003 SH404" bgcolor=#fefefe
| 0 ||  || MBA-I || 18.85 || data-sort-value="0.50" | 500 m || multiple || 2003–2022 || 27 Jan 2022 || 39 || align=left | Disc.: SDSSAlt.: 2016 GW177 || 
|- id="2003 SK404" bgcolor=#fefefe
| 1 ||  || MBA-I || 18.7 || data-sort-value="0.54" | 540 m || multiple || 2003–2017 || 18 Sep 2017 || 22 || align=left | Disc.: SDSSAdded on 22 July 2020Alt.: 2017 SY8 || 
|- id="2003 SN404" bgcolor=#fefefe
| 0 ||  || MBA-I || 19.3 || data-sort-value="0.41" | 410 m || multiple || 2003–2020 || 11 Aug 2020 || 27 || align=left | Disc.: SDSSAlt.: 2020 MC19 || 
|- id="2003 SQ404" bgcolor=#d6d6d6
| 0 ||  || MBA-O || 16.6 || 2.7 km || multiple || 2003–2019 || 19 Dec 2019 || 87 || align=left | Disc.: SDSS || 
|- id="2003 SR404" bgcolor=#d6d6d6
| 0 ||  || MBA-O || 16.37 || 3.0 km || multiple || 2003–2022 || 24 Jan 2022 || 97 || align=left | Disc.: SDSSAlt.: 2009 WM229 || 
|- id="2003 SY404" bgcolor=#fefefe
| 1 ||  || MBA-I || 19.1 || data-sort-value="0.45" | 450 m || multiple || 2003–2016 || 25 Sep 2016 || 32 || align=left | Disc.: SDSSAdded on 21 August 2021 || 
|- id="2003 SB405" bgcolor=#E9E9E9
| 0 ||  || MBA-M || 17.5 || data-sort-value="0.94" | 940 m || multiple || 2003–2021 || 10 Jan 2021 || 56 || align=left | Disc.: SDSSAlt.: 2013 BH39 || 
|- id="2003 SC405" bgcolor=#d6d6d6
| – ||  || MBA-O || 17.0 || 2.2 km || single || 3 days || 30 Sep 2003 || 6 || align=left | Disc.: SDSS || 
|- id="2003 SE405" bgcolor=#d6d6d6
| 0 ||  || MBA-O || 16.2 || 3.2 km || multiple || 2003–2021 || 19 Jan 2021 || 173 || align=left | Disc.: SDSSAlt.: 2014 WX501 || 
|- id="2003 SF405" bgcolor=#d6d6d6
| 0 ||  || MBA-O || 16.6 || 2.7 km || multiple || 2003–2020 || 05 Nov 2020 || 55 || align=left | Disc.: SDSSAlt.: 2013 JV50 || 
|- id="2003 SH405" bgcolor=#d6d6d6
| 0 ||  || MBA-O || 16.7 || 2.5 km || multiple || 2003–2020 || 23 Oct 2020 || 80 || align=left | Disc.: SDSSAlt.: 2011 BL142 || 
|- id="2003 SK405" bgcolor=#fefefe
| 0 ||  || MBA-I || 18.5 || data-sort-value="0.59" | 590 m || multiple || 2003–2021 || 04 Jan 2021 || 47 || align=left | Disc.: SDSS || 
|- id="2003 SM405" bgcolor=#d6d6d6
| 0 ||  || MBA-O || 17.2 || 2.0 km || multiple || 2003–2021 || 08 Jan 2021 || 64 || align=left | Disc.: SDSS || 
|- id="2003 SN405" bgcolor=#d6d6d6
| 0 ||  || MBA-O || 16.2 || 3.2 km || multiple || 2003–2021 || 14 Jan 2021 || 110 || align=left | Disc.: SDSS || 
|- id="2003 SR405" bgcolor=#d6d6d6
| 0 ||  || MBA-O || 17.1 || 2.1 km || multiple || 1995–2020 || 16 Apr 2020 || 65 || align=left | Disc.: SDSS || 
|- id="2003 SS405" bgcolor=#E9E9E9
| 2 ||  || MBA-M || 18.8 || data-sort-value="0.73" | 730 m || multiple || 2003–2020 || 09 Oct 2020 || 29 || align=left | Disc.: SDSSAdded on 17 January 2021 || 
|- id="2003 SV405" bgcolor=#E9E9E9
| 0 ||  || MBA-M || 17.89 || 1.5 km || multiple || 2003–2021 || 30 Oct 2021 || 53 || align=left | Disc.: SDSSAdded on 24 August 2020Alt.: 2020 JK6 || 
|- id="2003 SW405" bgcolor=#E9E9E9
| – ||  || MBA-M || 20.0 || data-sort-value="0.42" | 420 m || single || 54 days || 20 Nov 2003 || 11 || align=left | Disc.: SDSS || 
|- id="2003 SY405" bgcolor=#d6d6d6
| 0 ||  || MBA-O || 16.5 || 2.8 km || multiple || 2003–2021 || 04 Jan 2021 || 87 || align=left | Disc.: SDSSAlt.: 2014 WA313 || 
|- id="2003 SZ405" bgcolor=#d6d6d6
| 0 ||  || MBA-O || 16.98 || 2.2 km || multiple || 2003–2022 || 07 Jan 2022 || 63 || align=left | Disc.: SDSSAlt.: 2014 SV248 || 
|- id="2003 SK406" bgcolor=#d6d6d6
| 0 ||  || MBA-O || 16.5 || 2.8 km || multiple || 2003–2020 || 22 Dec 2020 || 69 || align=left | Disc.: SDSS || 
|- id="2003 SO406" bgcolor=#d6d6d6
| 0 ||  || MBA-O || 16.81 || 2.4 km || multiple || 2001–2021 || 17 Apr 2021 || 51 || align=left | Disc.: SDSS || 
|- id="2003 SS406" bgcolor=#d6d6d6
| 0 ||  || MBA-O || 16.9 || 2.3 km || multiple || 2003–2019 || 24 Dec 2019 || 61 || align=left | Disc.: SDSS || 
|- id="2003 ST406" bgcolor=#d6d6d6
| 0 ||  || MBA-O || 17.7 || 1.6 km || multiple || 2003–2020 || 08 Dec 2020 || 38 || align=left | Disc.: SDSS || 
|- id="2003 SU406" bgcolor=#d6d6d6
| 0 ||  || MBA-O || 15.88 || 3.7 km || multiple || 2003–2021 || 02 Apr 2021 || 150 || align=left | Disc.: SDSSAlt.: 2016 EU81 || 
|- id="2003 SY406" bgcolor=#d6d6d6
| 0 ||  || HIL || 15.8 || 3.9 km || multiple || 2003–2021 || 18 Jan 2021 || 107 || align=left | Disc.: SDSSAlt.: 2010 JL64 || 
|- id="2003 SE407" bgcolor=#E9E9E9
| 0 ||  || MBA-M || 17.21 || 1.5 km || multiple || 2003–2021 || 01 Dec 2021 || 78 || align=left | Disc.: SDSSAlt.: 2012 VF104 || 
|- id="2003 SG407" bgcolor=#d6d6d6
| 0 ||  || MBA-O || 16.49 || 2.8 km || multiple || 1997–2021 || 18 Apr 2021 || 112 || align=left | Disc.: SDSSAlt.: 2017 KY32 || 
|- id="2003 SN407" bgcolor=#d6d6d6
| 0 ||  || MBA-O || 16.8 || 2.4 km || multiple || 2003–2019 || 02 Nov 2019 || 48 || align=left | Disc.: SDSS || 
|- id="2003 SO407" bgcolor=#d6d6d6
| 0 ||  || MBA-O || 16.7 || 2.8 km || multiple || 2003–2021 || 14 Jan 2021 || 133 || align=left | Disc.: SDSSAlt.: 2010 FZ7 || 
|- id="2003 SP407" bgcolor=#fefefe
| 0 ||  || MBA-I || 18.9 || data-sort-value="0.49" | 490 m || multiple || 2003–2020 || 12 Dec 2020 || 53 || align=left | Disc.: SDSSAlt.: 2011 AF50 || 
|- id="2003 SQ407" bgcolor=#E9E9E9
| 0 ||  || MBA-M || 17.4 || 1.4 km || multiple || 2003–2020 || 14 Dec 2020 || 63 || align=left | Disc.: SDSS || 
|- id="2003 SU407" bgcolor=#d6d6d6
| 0 ||  || MBA-O || 16.4 || 2.9 km || multiple || 2003–2021 || 07 Jan 2021 || 99 || align=left | Disc.: SDSSAlt.: 2014 WL256 || 
|- id="2003 SV407" bgcolor=#E9E9E9
| 0 ||  || MBA-M || 17.2 || 1.1 km || multiple || 2003–2021 || 17 Jan 2021 || 92 || align=left | Disc.: SDSSAlt.: 2013 CF95 || 
|- id="2003 SZ407" bgcolor=#E9E9E9
| 0 ||  || MBA-M || 17.05 || 2.2 km || multiple || 2003–2021 || 30 Oct 2021 || 109 || align=left | Disc.: SDSS || 
|- id="2003 SC408" bgcolor=#E9E9E9
| – ||  || MBA-M || 18.0 || 1.4 km || single || 3 days || 30 Sep 2003 || 6 || align=left | Disc.: SDSS || 
|- id="2003 SE408" bgcolor=#d6d6d6
| 0 ||  || MBA-O || 16.85 || 2.4 km || multiple || 2003–2022 || 06 Jan 2022 || 94 || align=left | Disc.: SDSSAlt.: 2010 EF176, 2016 AR54 || 
|- id="2003 SJ408" bgcolor=#E9E9E9
| 0 ||  || MBA-M || 16.5 || 1.5 km || multiple || 2003–2020 || 19 Dec 2020 || 99 || align=left | Disc.: SDSSAlt.: 2013 CP122 || 
|- id="2003 SN408" bgcolor=#FA8072
| 0 ||  || MCA || 19.86 || data-sort-value="0.32" | 320 m || multiple || 2003–2020 || 17 Nov 2020 || 39 || align=left | Disc.: Spacewatch || 
|- id="2003 SS408" bgcolor=#E9E9E9
| 0 ||  || MBA-M || 17.2 || 2.0 km || multiple || 2002–2020 || 19 Apr 2020 || 107 || align=left | Disc.: SpacewatchAlt.: 2017 SQ130 || 
|- id="2003 SU408" bgcolor=#fefefe
| 0 ||  || MBA-I || 18.60 || data-sort-value="0.57" | 570 m || multiple || 2003–2021 || 08 Sep 2021 || 38 || align=left | Disc.: SDSSAlt.: 2014 QT417 || 
|- id="2003 SX408" bgcolor=#fefefe
| 0 ||  || MBA-I || 18.3 || data-sort-value="0.65" | 650 m || multiple || 2003–2020 || 24 Jan 2020 || 38 || align=left | Disc.: SDSS || 
|- id="2003 SZ408" bgcolor=#d6d6d6
| 0 ||  || MBA-O || 17.5 || 1.8 km || multiple || 2003–2020 || 12 Dec 2020 || 52 || align=left | Disc.: SDSSAlt.: 2014 SM342 || 
|- id="2003 SB409" bgcolor=#E9E9E9
| 3 ||  || MBA-M || 18.7 || data-sort-value="0.76" | 760 m || multiple || 2003–2020 || 22 Sep 2020 || 25 || align=left | Disc.: SDSSAdded on 17 January 2021 || 
|- id="2003 SC409" bgcolor=#fefefe
| 2 ||  || MBA-I || 19.5 || data-sort-value="0.37" | 370 m || multiple || 2003–2014 || 15 Sep 2014 || 18 || align=left | Disc.: SDSSAlt.: 2014 QW13 || 
|- id="2003 SD409" bgcolor=#FA8072
| 4 ||  || MCA || 18.0 || data-sort-value="0.75" | 750 m || multiple || 2003–2017 || 16 Apr 2017 || 37 || align=left | Disc.: LPL/Spacewatch IIAlt.: 2017 FF25 || 
|- id="2003 SE409" bgcolor=#E9E9E9
| 0 ||  || MBA-M || 17.79 || 1.5 km || multiple || 2003–2021 || 30 Aug 2021 || 47 || align=left | Disc.: LPL/Spacewatch IIAdded on 21 August 2021 || 
|- id="2003 SH409" bgcolor=#d6d6d6
| 0 ||  || MBA-O || 17.20 || 2.0 km || multiple || 2003–2021 || 14 Apr 2021 || 84 || align=left | Disc.: SDSSAlt.: 2014 WM416, 2016 EN169 || 
|- id="2003 SJ409" bgcolor=#fefefe
| 4 ||  || MBA-I || 19.2 || data-sort-value="0.43" | 430 m || multiple || 2003–2014 || 01 Oct 2014 || 16 || align=left | Disc.: SDSSAdded on 5 November 2021Alt.: 2014 SC86 || 
|- id="2003 SK409" bgcolor=#fefefe
| 0 ||  || MBA-I || 19.36 || data-sort-value="0.40" | 400 m || multiple || 2003–2021 || 08 Sep 2021 || 40 || align=left | Disc.: SDSS || 
|- id="2003 SL409" bgcolor=#d6d6d6
| 0 ||  || MBA-O || 17.8 || 1.5 km || multiple || 2003–2020 || 13 Sep 2020 || 20 || align=left | Disc.: LPL/Spacewatch IIAdded on 17 June 2021 || 
|- id="2003 SQ409" bgcolor=#E9E9E9
| 0 ||  || MBA-M || 18.26 || 1.2 km || multiple || 2003–2021 || 29 Aug 2021 || 33 || align=left | Disc.: SDSS || 
|- id="2003 SR409" bgcolor=#d6d6d6
| 0 ||  || MBA-O || 17.8 || 1.5 km || multiple || 2003–2020 || 22 Oct 2020 || 28 || align=left | Disc.: SDSS || 
|- id="2003 SS409" bgcolor=#E9E9E9
| 0 ||  || MBA-M || 17.7 || 1.6 km || multiple || 2003–2020 || 23 Mar 2020 || 33 || align=left | Disc.: SDSS || 
|- id="2003 ST409" bgcolor=#E9E9E9
| – ||  || MBA-M || 19.1 || data-sort-value="0.84" | 840 m || single || 13 days || 29 Sep 2003 || 7 || align=left | Disc.: SDSS || 
|- id="2003 SW409" bgcolor=#E9E9E9
| 0 ||  || MBA-M || 18.70 || 1.0 km || multiple || 1994–2021 || 31 Oct 2021 || 69 || align=left | Disc.: LPL/Spacewatch IIAlt.: 2012 SJ72 || 
|- id="2003 SY409" bgcolor=#d6d6d6
| 0 ||  || MBA-O || 17.02 || 2.2 km || multiple || 2003–2021 || 02 Dec 2021 || 129 || align=left | Disc.: LPL/Spacewatch II || 
|- id="2003 SA410" bgcolor=#d6d6d6
| 0 ||  || MBA-O || 17.5 || 1.8 km || multiple || 2003–2020 || 17 Nov 2020 || 47 || align=left | Disc.: SDSS || 
|- id="2003 SC410" bgcolor=#d6d6d6
| 3 ||  || MBA-O || 18.1 || 1.3 km || multiple || 2003–2019 || 25 Sep 2019 || 41 || align=left | Disc.: LPL/Spacewatch II || 
|- id="2003 SJ410" bgcolor=#fefefe
| 3 ||  || MBA-I || 19.6 || data-sort-value="0.36" | 360 m || multiple || 2003–2021 || 30 Nov 2021 || 23 || align=left | Disc.: LPL/Spacewatch IIAdded on 24 December 2021 || 
|- id="2003 SR410" bgcolor=#E9E9E9
| 0 ||  || MBA-M || 17.8 || 1.5 km || multiple || 2003–2020 || 15 May 2020 || 56 || align=left | Disc.: LPL/Spacewatch II || 
|- id="2003 SS410" bgcolor=#d6d6d6
| 0 ||  || MBA-O || 17.1 || 2.1 km || multiple || 2003–2020 || 25 Oct 2020 || 55 || align=left | Disc.: LPL/Spacewatch II || 
|- id="2003 ST410" bgcolor=#E9E9E9
| 0 ||  || MBA-M || 17.59 || 1.3 km || multiple || 2003–2022 || 06 Jan 2022 || 157 || align=left | Disc.: SDSSAlt.: 2006 JZ70 || 
|- id="2003 SZ410" bgcolor=#fefefe
| 4 ||  || MBA-I || 18.7 || data-sort-value="0.54" | 540 m || multiple || 2003–2016 || 28 Feb 2016 || 25 || align=left | Disc.: SDSSAlt.: 2007 UC118 || 
|- id="2003 SF411" bgcolor=#d6d6d6
| 0 ||  || MBA-O || 17.3 || 1.9 km || multiple || 2003–2021 || 14 Apr 2021 || 49 || align=left | Disc.: SDSS || 
|- id="2003 SK411" bgcolor=#d6d6d6
| 0 ||  || MBA-O || 16.62 || 2.6 km || multiple || 2003–2022 || 27 Jan 2022 || 86 || align=left | Disc.: SDSSAlt.: 2012 GY10, 2014 WY304 || 
|- id="2003 SQ411" bgcolor=#fefefe
| – ||  || MBA-I || 19.4 || data-sort-value="0.39" | 390 m || single || 2 days || 29 Sep 2003 || 7 || align=left | Disc.: SDSS || 
|- id="2003 SR411" bgcolor=#fefefe
| 1 ||  || MBA-I || 19.36 || data-sort-value="0.40" | 400 m || multiple || 2003–2021 || 13 Jul 2021 || 46 || align=left | Disc.: SDSSAlt.: 2014 SU332 || 
|- id="2003 ST411" bgcolor=#d6d6d6
| 0 ||  || MBA-O || 17.5 || 1.8 km || multiple || 2003–2019 || 08 Oct 2019 || 41 || align=left | Disc.: SDSS || 
|- id="2003 SV411" bgcolor=#d6d6d6
| 0 ||  || MBA-O || 16.8 || 2.4 km || multiple || 2003–2020 || 17 Oct 2020 || 58 || align=left | Disc.: SDSS || 
|- id="2003 SX411" bgcolor=#d6d6d6
| 0 ||  || MBA-O || 17.1 || 2.1 km || multiple || 2003–2018 || 18 Mar 2018 || 36 || align=left | Disc.: SDSSAlt.: 2014 SH102 || 
|- id="2003 SG412" bgcolor=#fefefe
| 2 ||  || MBA-I || 18.7 || data-sort-value="0.54" | 540 m || multiple || 2003–2018 || 10 Nov 2018 || 43 || align=left | Disc.: SDSSAlt.: 2014 RJ38 || 
|- id="2003 SH412" bgcolor=#E9E9E9
| – ||  || MBA-M || 17.5 || 1.8 km || single || 11 days || 29 Sep 2003 || 8 || align=left | Disc.: SDSS || 
|- id="2003 SK412" bgcolor=#fefefe
| 1 ||  || MBA-I || 19.9 || data-sort-value="0.31" | 310 m || multiple || 2003–2018 || 05 Oct 2018 || 34 || align=left | Disc.: SDSSAlt.: 2014 OW322 || 
|- id="2003 SO412" bgcolor=#E9E9E9
| 1 ||  || MBA-M || 19.7 || data-sort-value="0.48" | 480 m || multiple || 2003–2020 || 13 Sep 2020 || 28 || align=left | Disc.: SDSS || 
|- id="2003 SP412" bgcolor=#E9E9E9
| 1 ||  || MBA-M || 18.40 || data-sort-value="0.88" | 880 m || multiple || 2003–2021 || 11 Nov 2021 || 57 || align=left | Disc.: SDSSAlt.: 2012 TJ224 || 
|- id="2003 SS412" bgcolor=#fefefe
| 0 ||  || MBA-I || 18.57 || data-sort-value="0.57" | 570 m || multiple || 2003–2021 || 08 May 2021 || 66 || align=left | Disc.: SDSSAlt.: 2005 BW31 || 
|- id="2003 ST412" bgcolor=#d6d6d6
| 0 ||  || MBA-O || 17.16 || 2.1 km || multiple || 2003–2022 || 26 Jan 2022 || 64 || align=left | Disc.: SDSSAlt.: 2014 SG325 || 
|- id="2003 SY412" bgcolor=#fefefe
| 0 ||  || MBA-I || 18.99 || data-sort-value="0.47" | 470 m || multiple || 2003–2021 || 08 Nov 2021 || 81 || align=left | Disc.: SpacewatchAlt.: 2014 WZ440 || 
|- id="2003 SF413" bgcolor=#d6d6d6
| 1 ||  || MBA-O || 17.0 || 2.2 km || multiple || 2003–2020 || 11 Sep 2020 || 27 || align=left | Disc.: SpacewatchAlt.: 2003 SV345, 2015 UR63 || 
|- id="2003 SL413" bgcolor=#d6d6d6
| 0 ||  || MBA-O || 17.66 || 1.6 km || multiple || 2001–2021 || 15 Apr 2021 || 48 || align=left | Disc.: SDSSAdded on 21 August 2021Alt.: 2008 RS43 || 
|- id="2003 SO413" bgcolor=#d6d6d6
| 0 ||  || MBA-O || 17.8 || 1.5 km || multiple || 2003–2021 || 19 Feb 2021 || 31 || align=left | Disc.: SDSSAdded on 11 May 2021 || 
|- id="2003 SP413" bgcolor=#d6d6d6
| 0 ||  || MBA-O || 17.2 || 2.0 km || multiple || 2003–2020 || 07 Dec 2020 || 37 || align=left | Disc.: SDSS || 
|- id="2003 SS413" bgcolor=#d6d6d6
| 0 ||  || MBA-O || 16.5 || 2.8 km || multiple || 2003–2021 || 22 Jan 2021 || 139 || align=left | Disc.: SDSSAlt.: 2013 PN57, 2014 UE174, 2016 CN117 || 
|- id="2003 ST413" bgcolor=#E9E9E9
| 3 ||  || MBA-M || 18.5 || 1.1 km || multiple || 2003–2017 || 22 Oct 2017 || 24 || align=left | Disc.: SDSS || 
|- id="2003 SX413" bgcolor=#fefefe
| 0 ||  || MBA-I || 18.53 || data-sort-value="0.58" | 580 m || multiple || 2003–2022 || 25 Jan 2022 || 63 || align=left | Disc.: SDSS || 
|- id="2003 SZ413" bgcolor=#E9E9E9
| 1 ||  || MBA-M || 19.28 || data-sort-value="0.78" | 780 m || multiple || 2003–2021 || 27 Oct 2021 || 43 || align=left | Disc.: SDSS || 
|- id="2003 SC414" bgcolor=#d6d6d6
| 0 ||  || MBA-O || 17.96 || 1.4 km || multiple || 2003–2021 || 14 May 2021 || 107 || align=left | Disc.: SDSSAlt.: 2015 DA86, 2017 OG23 || 
|- id="2003 SD414" bgcolor=#E9E9E9
| 0 ||  || MBA-M || 17.96 || 1.4 km || multiple || 2003–2021 || 10 Nov 2021 || 82 || align=left | Disc.: SDSSAlt.: 2012 TZ271 || 
|- id="2003 SH414" bgcolor=#d6d6d6
| 3 ||  || MBA-O || 17.6 || 1.7 km || multiple || 2001–2016 || 10 Mar 2016 || 29 || align=left | Disc.: SDSSAdded on 17 January 2021Alt.: 2016 DD10 || 
|- id="2003 SJ414" bgcolor=#E9E9E9
| – ||  || MBA-M || 19.1 || data-sort-value="0.64" | 640 m || single || 3 days || 29 Sep 2003 || 9 || align=left | Disc.: SDSS || 
|- id="2003 SN414" bgcolor=#fefefe
| 3 ||  || MBA-I || 20.0 || data-sort-value="0.30" | 300 m || multiple || 2003–2021 || 12 Sep 2021 || 28 || align=left | Disc.: SDSSAdded on 30 September 2021Alt.: 2003 SQ380 || 
|- id="2003 SO414" bgcolor=#E9E9E9
| 0 ||  || MBA-M || 18.10 || 1.0 km || multiple || 2001–2022 || 09 Jan 2022 || 41 || align=left | Disc.: SDSSAdded on 19 October 2020Alt.: 2018 AT16 || 
|- id="2003 SP414" bgcolor=#E9E9E9
| 0 ||  || MBA-M || 17.78 || 1.5 km || multiple || 2003–2021 || 02 Oct 2021 || 50 || align=left | Disc.: SDSSAdded on 22 July 2020 || 
|- id="2003 SR414" bgcolor=#fefefe
| 1 ||  || MBA-I || 18.5 || data-sort-value="0.59" | 590 m || multiple || 2003–2020 || 02 Feb 2020 || 61 || align=left | Disc.: SDSSAlt.: 2011 UU154, 2011 XH4 || 
|- id="2003 SS414" bgcolor=#fefefe
| – ||  || MBA-I || 19.8 || data-sort-value="0.33" | 330 m || single || 3 days || 29 Sep 2003 || 7 || align=left | Disc.: SDSS || 
|- id="2003 ST414" bgcolor=#fefefe
| 2 ||  || MBA-I || 19.4 || data-sort-value="0.39" | 390 m || multiple || 2003–2017 || 23 Oct 2017 || 32 || align=left | Disc.: SDSSAlt.: 2010 TB159 || 
|- id="2003 SU414" bgcolor=#fefefe
| 1 ||  || MBA-I || 18.8 || data-sort-value="0.52" | 520 m || multiple || 2003–2021 || 10 Jun 2021 || 83 || align=left | Disc.: SDSSAlt.: 2014 QA384 || 
|- id="2003 SX414" bgcolor=#E9E9E9
| 0 ||  || MBA-M || 17.2 || 2.0 km || multiple || 2003–2020 || 23 Jun 2020 || 87 || align=left | Disc.: SDSSAlt.: 2005 FH19, 2017 SJ94 || 
|- id="2003 SZ414" bgcolor=#d6d6d6
| 0 ||  || MBA-O || 17.2 || 2.0 km || multiple || 2001–2020 || 22 Mar 2020 || 81 || align=left | Disc.: SDSSAlt.: 2015 BV191 || 
|- id="2003 SC415" bgcolor=#E9E9E9
| 1 ||  || MBA-M || 18.03 || 1.0 km || multiple || 2003–2021 || 03 Dec 2021 || 52 || align=left | Disc.: SDSSAdded on 24 December 2021 || 
|- id="2003 SD415" bgcolor=#E9E9E9
| 0 ||  || MBA-M || 18.41 || data-sort-value="0.87" | 870 m || multiple || 2003–2022 || 25 Jan 2022 || 44 || align=left | Disc.: SDSSAdded on 17 January 2021 || 
|- id="2003 SF415" bgcolor=#E9E9E9
| 0 ||  || MBA-M || 18.5 || data-sort-value="0.84" | 840 m || multiple || 2003–2020 || 23 Oct 2020 || 29 || align=left | Disc.: SDSSAdded on 17 June 2021 || 
|- id="2003 SQ415" bgcolor=#fefefe
| 1 ||  || HUN || 19.31 || data-sort-value="0.41" | 410 m || multiple || 2003–2021 || 17 Apr 2021 || 41 || align=left | Disc.: SDSS || 
|- id="2003 SU415" bgcolor=#E9E9E9
| 0 ||  || MBA-M || 17.92 || 1.5 km || multiple || 2003–2021 || 13 Sep 2021 || 45 || align=left | Disc.: SDSSAdded on 21 August 2021 || 
|- id="2003 SZ415" bgcolor=#d6d6d6
| 2 ||  || MBA-O || 17.0 || 2.2 km || multiple || 2003–2020 || 08 Nov 2020 || 35 || align=left | Disc.: SDSS || 
|- id="2003 SE416" bgcolor=#fefefe
| 0 ||  || MBA-I || 18.77 || data-sort-value="0.52" | 520 m || multiple || 2003–2021 || 11 Oct 2021 || 59 || align=left | Disc.: SDSS || 
|- id="2003 SG416" bgcolor=#d6d6d6
| 0 ||  || MBA-O || 16.42 || 2.9 km || multiple || 2003–2022 || 21 Jan 2022 || 87 || align=left | Disc.: SDSSAlt.: 2017 EQ19 || 
|- id="2003 SH416" bgcolor=#fefefe
| 0 ||  || MBA-I || 18.18 || data-sort-value="0.69" | 690 m || multiple || 1998–2021 || 04 Oct 2021 || 128 || align=left | Disc.: SDSS || 
|- id="2003 SJ416" bgcolor=#d6d6d6
| 0 ||  || MBA-O || 16.6 || 2.7 km || multiple || 2003–2021 || 04 Jan 2021 || 104 || align=left | Disc.: SDSS || 
|- id="2003 SM416" bgcolor=#fefefe
| 0 ||  || MBA-I || 17.69 || data-sort-value="0.86" | 860 m || multiple || 2002–2022 || 22 Jan 2022 || 164 || align=left | Disc.: SDSSAlt.: 2010 OR43 || 
|- id="2003 SO416" bgcolor=#fefefe
| 2 ||  || MBA-I || 19.7 || data-sort-value="0.34" | 340 m || multiple || 2003–2020 || 08 Oct 2020 || 19 || align=left | Disc.: SDSSAdded on 17 January 2021 || 
|- id="2003 SP416" bgcolor=#fefefe
| 2 ||  || MBA-I || 19.6 || data-sort-value="0.36" | 360 m || multiple || 2003–2016 || 27 Aug 2016 || 16 || align=left | Disc.: SDSSAdded on 17 January 2021 || 
|- id="2003 ST416" bgcolor=#E9E9E9
| 1 ||  || MBA-M || 17.98 || 1.4 km || multiple || 2003–2021 || 08 Sep 2021 || 37 || align=left | Disc.: SDSSAdded on 21 August 2021Alt.: 2008 WZ75 || 
|- id="2003 SX416" bgcolor=#d6d6d6
| 0 ||  || MBA-O || 16.58 || 2.7 km || multiple || 2003–2022 || 27 Jan 2022 || 101 || align=left | Disc.: SDSSAlt.: 2014 UP147 || 
|- id="2003 SY416" bgcolor=#E9E9E9
| – ||  || MBA-M || 18.7 || data-sort-value="0.76" | 760 m || single || 21 days || 19 Oct 2003 || 6 || align=left | Disc.: SDSS || 
|- id="2003 SE417" bgcolor=#fefefe
| 0 ||  || MBA-I || 18.35 || data-sort-value="0.64" | 640 m || multiple || 2003–2021 || 11 Sep 2021 || 63 || align=left | Disc.: SDSS || 
|- id="2003 SF417" bgcolor=#fefefe
| 0 ||  || MBA-I || 17.99 || data-sort-value="0.75" | 750 m || multiple || 2003–2021 || 16 May 2021 || 87 || align=left | Disc.: SDSSAlt.: 2006 GP32 || 
|- id="2003 SG417" bgcolor=#d6d6d6
| 0 ||  || MBA-O || 17.6 || 1.7 km || multiple || 2003–2019 || 31 Oct 2019 || 45 || align=left | Disc.: SDSS || 
|- id="2003 SK417" bgcolor=#E9E9E9
| 0 ||  || MBA-M || 17.44 || 1.8 km || multiple || 2003–2021 || 14 Nov 2021 || 73 || align=left | Disc.: SDSSAlt.: 2015 GW49 || 
|- id="2003 SL417" bgcolor=#fefefe
| 1 ||  || MBA-I || 19.14 || data-sort-value="0.44" | 440 m || multiple || 2003–2021 || 31 Jul 2021 || 29 || align=left | Disc.: SDSSAlt.: 2014 QT335 || 
|- id="2003 SM417" bgcolor=#d6d6d6
| 0 ||  || MBA-O || 17.2 || 2.0 km || multiple || 2003–2021 || 18 Jan 2021 || 55 || align=left | Disc.: SDSSAdded on 21 August 2021Alt.: 2015 AH207 || 
|- id="2003 SO417" bgcolor=#fefefe
| 0 ||  || MBA-I || 18.83 || data-sort-value="0.51" | 510 m || multiple || 2003–2022 || 25 Jan 2022 || 67 || align=left | Disc.: SDSSAdded on 19 October 2020Alt.: 2013 NC7 || 
|- id="2003 SP417" bgcolor=#E9E9E9
| 0 ||  || MBA-M || 18.0 || data-sort-value="0.75" | 750 m || multiple || 2003–2021 || 06 Jan 2021 || 31 || align=left | Disc.: SDSSAdded on 30 September 2021Alt.: 2007 RX355 || 
|- id="2003 SS417" bgcolor=#d6d6d6
| 0 ||  || MBA-O || 17.45 || 1.8 km || multiple || 2003–2022 || 25 Jan 2022 || 30 || align=left | Disc.: SDSSAdded on 17 January 2021Alt.: 2005 BZ47 || 
|- id="2003 ST417" bgcolor=#d6d6d6
| 0 ||  || MBA-O || 17.7 || 1.6 km || multiple || 2003–2020 || 19 Nov 2020 || 29 || align=left | Disc.: SDSS || 
|- id="2003 SU417" bgcolor=#FA8072
| 3 ||  || MCA || 19.3 || data-sort-value="0.41" | 410 m || multiple || 2003–2019 || 24 Sep 2019 || 26 || align=left | Disc.: SDSSAdded on 22 July 2020 || 
|- id="2003 SW417" bgcolor=#d6d6d6
| 0 ||  || MBA-O || 16.9 || 2.3 km || multiple || 2003–2020 || 08 Dec 2020 || 51 || align=left | Disc.: SDSSAlt.: 2014 SA193 || 
|- id="2003 SA418" bgcolor=#E9E9E9
| 0 ||  || MBA-M || 18.2 || data-sort-value="0.96" | 960 m || multiple || 2003–2020 || 20 Oct 2020 || 55 || align=left | Disc.: SDSS || 
|- id="2003 SC418" bgcolor=#d6d6d6
| 0 ||  || MBA-O || 17.29 || 1.9 km || multiple || 2003–2021 || 19 May 2021 || 118 || align=left | Disc.: SDSS || 
|- id="2003 SH418" bgcolor=#E9E9E9
| 0 ||  || MBA-M || 17.00 || 1.7 km || multiple || 2002–2020 || 07 Dec 2020 || 124 || align=left | Disc.: SDSSAlt.: 2010 ED21, 2015 MO113 || 
|- id="2003 SJ418" bgcolor=#fefefe
| 0 ||  || MBA-I || 19.21 || data-sort-value="0.43" | 430 m || multiple || 2003–2021 || 29 Nov 2021 || 25 || align=left | Disc.: SDSSAdded on 24 December 2021 || 
|- id="2003 SN418" bgcolor=#E9E9E9
| 1 ||  || MBA-M || 18.2 || data-sort-value="0.68" | 680 m || multiple || 2003–2021 || 18 Jan 2021 || 41 || align=left | Disc.: SDSS || 
|- id="2003 SP418" bgcolor=#E9E9E9
| 0 ||  || MBA-M || 17.3 || 1.0 km || multiple || 2003–2021 || 08 Jan 2021 || 91 || align=left | Disc.: SDSS || 
|- id="2003 SQ418" bgcolor=#fefefe
| 0 ||  || MBA-I || 17.6 || data-sort-value="0.90" | 900 m || multiple || 2003–2020 || 21 Apr 2020 || 117 || align=left | Disc.: SDSSAlt.: 2012 AO22 || 
|- id="2003 SS418" bgcolor=#d6d6d6
| 0 ||  || MBA-O || 17.7 || 1.6 km || multiple || 2003–2019 || 19 Dec 2019 || 23 || align=left | Disc.: SDSS || 
|- id="2003 SW418" bgcolor=#E9E9E9
| 0 ||  || MBA-M || 17.88 || data-sort-value="0.79" | 790 m || multiple || 2003–2021 || 15 Apr 2021 || 94 || align=left | Disc.: SDSSAlt.: 2015 PA55 || 
|- id="2003 SY418" bgcolor=#fefefe
| 0 ||  || MBA-I || 18.2 || data-sort-value="0.68" | 680 m || multiple || 2003–2021 || 09 Jan 2021 || 69 || align=left | Disc.: SDSSAlt.: 2013 UW9 || 
|- id="2003 SZ418" bgcolor=#d6d6d6
| 0 ||  || MBA-O || 16.8 || 2.4 km || multiple || 2003–2021 || 18 Jan 2021 || 70 || align=left | Disc.: SDSSAlt.: 2014 WA275 || 
|- id="2003 SC419" bgcolor=#d6d6d6
| 0 ||  || MBA-O || 16.0 || 3.5 km || multiple || 2003–2021 || 05 Jan 2021 || 159 || align=left | Disc.: SDSSAlt.: 2014 VL7 || 
|- id="2003 SD419" bgcolor=#E9E9E9
| 0 ||  || MBA-M || 17.23 || 2.0 km || multiple || 2003–2021 || 25 Nov 2021 || 83 || align=left | Disc.: SDSSAlt.: 2015 KM68 || 
|- id="2003 SE419" bgcolor=#d6d6d6
| – ||  || MBA-O || 17.3 || 1.9 km || single || 4 days || 30 Sep 2003 || 8 || align=left | Disc.: SDSS || 
|- id="2003 SF419" bgcolor=#d6d6d6
| 0 ||  || MBA-O || 17.1 || 2.1 km || multiple || 2003–2021 || 15 Jan 2021 || 55 || align=left | Disc.: SDSS || 
|- id="2003 SL419" bgcolor=#d6d6d6
| 0 ||  || MBA-O || 16.1 || 3.4 km || multiple || 2001–2021 || 18 Jan 2021 || 130 || align=left | Disc.: SDSSAlt.: 2015 AY22 || 
|- id="2003 SM419" bgcolor=#E9E9E9
| 1 ||  || MBA-M || 18.1 || 1.0 km || multiple || 2003–2020 || 14 Sep 2020 || 27 || align=left | Disc.: SDSSAdded on 19 October 2020 || 
|- id="2003 SQ419" bgcolor=#E9E9E9
| 0 ||  || MBA-M || 17.3 || 1.9 km || multiple || 2003–2018 || 05 Jan 2018 || 81 || align=left | Disc.: SDSS || 
|- id="2003 SR419" bgcolor=#d6d6d6
| 0 ||  || MBA-O || 17.1 || 2.1 km || multiple || 2003–2020 || 07 Dec 2020 || 39 || align=left | Disc.: SDSSAlt.: 2014 TS110 || 
|- id="2003 SU419" bgcolor=#E9E9E9
| 0 ||  || MBA-M || 17.3 || 1.0 km || multiple || 2003–2021 || 18 Jan 2021 || 103 || align=left | Disc.: SDSSAlt.: 2017 BF1 || 
|- id="2003 SY419" bgcolor=#d6d6d6
| 1 ||  || MBA-O || 17.2 || 2.0 km || multiple || 2003–2015 || 16 Jan 2015 || 17 || align=left | Disc.: SDSSAlt.: 2014 WP325 || 
|- id="2003 SZ419" bgcolor=#E9E9E9
| 1 ||  || MBA-M || 19.3 || data-sort-value="0.41" | 410 m || multiple || 2003–2019 || 26 Nov 2019 || 80 || align=left | Disc.: SDSSAlt.: 2011 UZ133 || 
|- id="2003 SB420" bgcolor=#d6d6d6
| 0 ||  || MBA-O || 17.1 || 2.1 km || multiple || 2003–2020 || 06 Dec 2020 || 43 || align=left | Disc.: SDSS || 
|- id="2003 SF420" bgcolor=#d6d6d6
| 0 ||  || MBA-O || 17.3 || 1.9 km || multiple || 2003–2020 || 01 Feb 2020 || 50 || align=left | Disc.: SDSSAdded on 22 July 2020Alt.: 2015 AK230 || 
|- id="2003 SO420" bgcolor=#d6d6d6
| 0 ||  || MBA-O || 16.8 || 2.4 km || multiple || 2003–2020 || 17 Oct 2020 || 82 || align=left | Disc.: SDSSAlt.: 2015 XX24 || 
|- id="2003 SP420" bgcolor=#fefefe
| 0 ||  || MBA-I || 17.8 || data-sort-value="0.82" | 820 m || multiple || 2003–2021 || 04 Apr 2021 || 68 || align=left | Disc.: SDSSAlt.: 2003 US446, 2003 UL343, 2014 OC78, 2017 FL17 || 
|- id="2003 SS420" bgcolor=#d6d6d6
| 0 ||  || MBA-O || 17.9 || 1.5 km || multiple || 2003–2019 || 05 Nov 2019 || 24 || align=left | Disc.: SDSSAdded on 17 January 2021 || 
|- id="2003 ST420" bgcolor=#fefefe
| 0 ||  || MBA-I || 18.9 || data-sort-value="0.49" | 490 m || multiple || 2003–2021 || 18 Jan 2021 || 33 || align=left | Disc.: SDSSAlt.: 2013 TW37 || 
|- id="2003 SC421" bgcolor=#d6d6d6
| – ||  || MBA-O || 17.4 || 1.8 km || single || 4 days || 30 Sep 2003 || 9 || align=left | Disc.: SDSS || 
|- id="2003 SK421" bgcolor=#E9E9E9
| 2 ||  || MBA-M || 17.6 || 1.7 km || multiple || 2003–2017 || 26 Sep 2017 || 24 || align=left | Disc.: SDSSAdded on 17 June 2021 || 
|- id="2003 SL421" bgcolor=#fefefe
| 0 ||  || HUN || 19.98 || data-sort-value="0.30" | 300 m || multiple || 2003–2021 || 07 Nov 2021 || 33 || align=left | Disc.: SDSSAdded on 5 November 2021 || 
|- id="2003 SO421" bgcolor=#d6d6d6
| 0 ||  || MBA-O || 16.44 || 2.9 km || multiple || 2003–2021 || 27 Oct 2021 || 89 || align=left | Disc.: SDSSAlt.: 2006 EE12 || 
|- id="2003 SB422" bgcolor=#E9E9E9
| 1 ||  || MBA-M || 17.4 || 1.4 km || multiple || 2003–2020 || 08 Dec 2020 || 113 || align=left | Disc.: Ondřejov Obs. || 
|- id="2003 SD422" bgcolor=#d6d6d6
| 1 ||  || MBA-O || 17.4 || 1.8 km || multiple || 2003–2020 || 17 Oct 2020 || 37 || align=left | Disc.: SDSSAlt.: 2003 UL332, 2020 RO31 || 
|- id="2003 SE422" bgcolor=#fefefe
| 1 ||  || MBA-I || 18.54 || data-sort-value="0.58" | 580 m || multiple || 2003–2021 || 07 Sep 2021 || 30 || align=left | Disc.: SDSSAlt.: 2014 QJ322 || 
|- id="2003 SF422" bgcolor=#d6d6d6
| 0 ||  || MBA-O || 16.9 || 2.3 km || multiple || 2003–2020 || 27 Sep 2020 || 46 || align=left | Disc.: SDSS || 
|- id="2003 SG422" bgcolor=#E9E9E9
| 0 ||  || MBA-M || 17.6 || data-sort-value="0.90" | 900 m || multiple || 1995–2019 || 04 Jul 2019 || 57 || align=left | Disc.: SDSSAlt.: 2003 UW351 || 
|- id="2003 SH422" bgcolor=#fefefe
| 2 ||  || MBA-I || 18.9 || data-sort-value="0.49" | 490 m || multiple || 2003–2018 || 21 Apr 2018 || 40 || align=left | Disc.: SDSS || 
|- id="2003 SJ422" bgcolor=#d6d6d6
| D ||  || MBA-O || 18.2 || 1.3 km || single || 28 days || 24 Oct 2003 || 8 || align=left | Disc.: SDSSAlt.: 2003 UP385 || 
|- id="2003 SL422" bgcolor=#fefefe
| 0 ||  || MBA-I || 18.5 || data-sort-value="0.59" | 590 m || multiple || 2003–2020 || 06 Dec 2020 || 70 || align=left | Disc.: SDSS || 
|- id="2003 SM422" bgcolor=#E9E9E9
| 0 ||  || MBA-M || 17.3 || 1.5 km || multiple || 2003–2021 || 12 Jan 2021 || 168 || align=left | Disc.: SDSSAlt.: 2003 UZ392, 2013 AE35 || 
|- id="2003 SN422" bgcolor=#fefefe
| 0 ||  || MBA-I || 18.8 || data-sort-value="0.52" | 520 m || multiple || 2003–2018 || 04 Dec 2018 || 47 || align=left | Disc.: SDSSAlt.: 2003 UR352 || 
|- id="2003 SO422" bgcolor=#fefefe
| 0 ||  || MBA-I || 18.73 || data-sort-value="0.53" | 530 m || multiple || 2003–2021 || 27 Oct 2021 || 41 || align=left | Disc.: SDSSAdded on 5 November 2021 || 
|- id="2003 SS422" bgcolor=#C2E0FF
| 2 ||  || TNO || 7.20 || 137 km || multiple || 2000–2020 || 18 Nov 2020 || 48 || align=left | Disc.: Cerro TololoLoUTNOs, SDO || 
|- id="2003 SU422" bgcolor=#fefefe
| 0 ||  || MBA-I || 18.2 || data-sort-value="0.68" | 680 m || multiple || 2003–2020 || 02 Feb 2020 || 47 || align=left | Disc.: LPL/Spacewatch II || 
|- id="2003 SD423" bgcolor=#fefefe
| 0 ||  || MBA-I || 18.68 || data-sort-value="0.55" | 550 m || multiple || 2003–2021 || 13 Apr 2021 || 54 || align=left | Disc.: Spacewatch || 
|- id="2003 SB424" bgcolor=#fefefe
| 0 ||  || MBA-I || 18.8 || data-sort-value="0.52" | 520 m || multiple || 2003–2020 || 15 May 2020 || 64 || align=left | Disc.: SDSSAlt.: 2016 GH27 || 
|- id="2003 SD424" bgcolor=#d6d6d6
| 0 ||  || MBA-O || 17.1 || 2.1 km || multiple || 2003–2020 || 09 Sep 2020 || 33 || align=left | Disc.: Mauna Kea Obs. || 
|- id="2003 SL424" bgcolor=#d6d6d6
| 2 ||  || MBA-O || 17.3 || 1.9 km || multiple || 2003–2019 || 26 Sep 2019 || 40 || align=left | Disc.: Mauna Kea Obs. || 
|- id="2003 SR424" bgcolor=#fefefe
| 0 ||  || MBA-I || 18.36 || data-sort-value="0.63" | 630 m || multiple || 2003–2021 || 15 Apr 2021 || 77 || align=left | Disc.: Mauna Kea Obs.Alt.: 2013 CZ108 || 
|- id="2003 SZ424" bgcolor=#fefefe
| 0 ||  || MBA-I || 18.87 || data-sort-value="0.50" | 500 m || multiple || 2002–2021 || 12 May 2021 || 73 || align=left | Disc.: Mauna Kea Obs.Alt.: 2005 CR46 || 
|- id="2003 SH425" bgcolor=#E9E9E9
| 2 ||  || MBA-M || 18.1 || 1.3 km || multiple || 2003–2021 || 04 Oct 2021 || 26 || align=left | Disc.: SDSSAdded on 29 January 2022 || 
|- id="2003 SJ425" bgcolor=#E9E9E9
| 0 ||  || MBA-M || 18.0 || 1.4 km || multiple || 2003–2021 || 04 Oct 2021 || 199 || align=left | Disc.: SDSSAdded on 29 January 2022 || 
|- id="2003 SK425" bgcolor=#d6d6d6
| 0 ||  || MBA-O || 17.7 || 1.6 km || multiple || 2003–2020 || 17 Oct 2020 || 52 || align=left | Disc.: SDSSAlt.: 2014 SP238 || 
|- id="2003 SQ425" bgcolor=#d6d6d6
| 0 ||  || MBA-O || 17.3 || 1.9 km || multiple || 2003–2018 || 12 Sep 2018 || 50 || align=left | Disc.: SDSS || 
|- id="2003 SV425" bgcolor=#fefefe
| 0 ||  || MBA-I || 19.05 || data-sort-value="0.46" | 460 m || multiple || 2002–2021 || 28 Oct 2021 || 50 || align=left | Disc.: Mauna Kea Obs.Added on 22 July 2020 || 
|- id="2003 SW425" bgcolor=#E9E9E9
| 1 ||  || MBA-M || 19.0 || data-sort-value="0.67" | 670 m || multiple || 2003–2020 || 11 Dec 2020 || 46 || align=left | Disc.: Mauna Kea Obs.Alt.: 2020 SJ32 || 
|- id="2003 SJ426" bgcolor=#d6d6d6
| 0 ||  || MBA-O || 17.5 || 1.8 km || multiple || 2000–2020 || 13 Sep 2020 || 40 || align=left | Disc.: Mauna Kea Obs.Added on 17 January 2021Alt.: 2014 OG305 || 
|- id="2003 SQ426" bgcolor=#fefefe
| E ||  || MBA-I || 19.5 || data-sort-value="0.37" | 370 m || single || 4 days || 29 Sep 2003 || 6 || align=left | Disc.: Mauna Kea Obs. || 
|- id="2003 ST426" bgcolor=#d6d6d6
| 3 ||  || MBA-O || 18.6 || 1.1 km || multiple || 2003–2019 || 02 Nov 2019 || 27 || align=left | Disc.: Mauna Kea Obs.Added on 11 May 2021Alt.: 2014 WS587 || 
|- id="2003 SV426" bgcolor=#E9E9E9
| – ||  || MBA-M || 19.7 || data-sort-value="0.48" | 480 m || single || 4 days || 29 Sep 2003 || 6 || align=left | Disc.: Mauna Kea Obs. || 
|- id="2003 SW426" bgcolor=#d6d6d6
| 0 ||  || MBA-O || 17.40 || 1.8 km || multiple || 2003–2021 || 30 Nov 2021 || 48 || align=left | Disc.: Mauna Kea Obs.Alt.: 2020 PD24 || 
|- id="2003 SZ426" bgcolor=#fefefe
| 0 ||  || MBA-I || 19.13 || data-sort-value="0.44" | 440 m || multiple || 2003–2021 || 08 May 2021 || 36 || align=left | Disc.: Mauna Kea Obs. || 
|- id="2003 SB427" bgcolor=#E9E9E9
| 0 ||  || MBA-M || 18.16 || 1.3 km || multiple || 2001–2021 || 09 Aug 2021 || 42 || align=left | Disc.: Mauna Kea Obs.Alt.: 2010 KL13 || 
|- id="2003 SS427" bgcolor=#fefefe
| 0 ||  || MBA-I || 18.00 || data-sort-value="0.75" | 750 m || multiple || 2003–2021 || 11 May 2021 || 85 || align=left | Disc.: SDSS || 
|- id="2003 SY427" bgcolor=#d6d6d6
| 0 ||  || MBA-O || 17.2 || 2.0 km || multiple || 1998–2020 || 04 Jan 2020 || 30 || align=left | Disc.: Spacewatch || 
|- id="2003 SA428" bgcolor=#E9E9E9
| 3 ||  || MBA-M || 18.7 || data-sort-value="0.76" | 760 m || multiple || 2003–2016 || 02 Oct 2016 || 28 || align=left | Disc.: Spacewatch || 
|- id="2003 SC428" bgcolor=#fefefe
| 0 ||  || MBA-I || 18.8 || data-sort-value="0.52" | 520 m || multiple || 2003–2020 || 11 Oct 2020 || 106 || align=left | Disc.: Spacewatch || 
|- id="2003 SD428" bgcolor=#E9E9E9
| 0 ||  || MBA-M || 17.2 || 1.1 km || multiple || 2003–2021 || 03 Jan 2021 || 93 || align=left | Disc.: Spacewatch || 
|- id="2003 SF428" bgcolor=#E9E9E9
| 0 ||  || MBA-M || 17.4 || data-sort-value="0.98" | 980 m || multiple || 2003–2021 || 18 Jan 2021 || 139 || align=left | Disc.: LONEOSAlt.: 2015 PV75 || 
|- id="2003 SL428" bgcolor=#fefefe
| 0 ||  || MBA-I || 17.57 || data-sort-value="0.91" | 910 m || multiple || 2001–2021 || 15 Apr 2021 || 71 || align=left | Disc.: SpacewatchAlt.: 2011 SB250 || 
|- id="2003 SM428" bgcolor=#E9E9E9
| 3 ||  || MBA-M || 19.0 || data-sort-value="0.88" | 880 m || multiple || 2003–2017 || 24 Nov 2017 || 28 || align=left | Disc.: Spacewatch || 
|- id="2003 SP428" bgcolor=#E9E9E9
| – ||  || MBA-M || 19.0 || data-sort-value="0.47" | 470 m || single || 11 days || 29 Sep 2003 || 11 || align=left | Disc.: Spacewatch || 
|- id="2003 ST428" bgcolor=#E9E9E9
| 0 ||  || MBA-M || 17.6 || data-sort-value="0.90" | 900 m || multiple || 2003–2021 || 04 Jan 2021 || 56 || align=left | Disc.: Spacewatch || 
|- id="2003 SU428" bgcolor=#E9E9E9
| 2 ||  || MBA-M || 17.5 || 1.8 km || multiple || 2001–2017 || 24 Oct 2017 || 73 || align=left | Disc.: Spacewatch || 
|- id="2003 SW428" bgcolor=#d6d6d6
| 0 ||  || HIL || 16.0 || 3.5 km || multiple || 2001–2021 || 18 Jan 2021 || 114 || align=left | Disc.: NEAT || 
|- id="2003 SC429" bgcolor=#E9E9E9
| 2 ||  || MBA-M || 17.7 || 1.2 km || multiple || 2003–2016 || 07 Sep 2016 || 27 || align=left | Disc.: Spacewatch || 
|- id="2003 SD429" bgcolor=#E9E9E9
| 0 ||  || MBA-M || 17.4 || 1.4 km || multiple || 2003–2020 || 14 Sep 2020 || 94 || align=left | Disc.: Spacewatch || 
|- id="2003 SJ429" bgcolor=#fefefe
| 0 ||  || MBA-I || 18.24 || data-sort-value="0.67" | 670 m || multiple || 2003–2021 || 13 Apr 2021 || 53 || align=left | Disc.: LONEOS || 
|- id="2003 SM429" bgcolor=#FA8072
| 2 ||  || MCA || 19.26 || data-sort-value="0.34" | 340 m || multiple || 2003-2022 || 28 Sep 2022 || 28 || align=left | Disc.: SDSS || 
|- id="2003 SY429" bgcolor=#fefefe
| 0 ||  || MBA-I || 18.95 || data-sort-value="0.48" | 480 m || multiple || 1992–2021 || 26 Oct 2021 || 99 || align=left | Disc.: SpacewatchAlt.: 2006 KZ46 || 
|- id="2003 SD430" bgcolor=#fefefe
| – ||  || HUN || 20.5 || data-sort-value="0.24" | 240 m || single || 22 days || 22 Oct 2003 || 9 || align=left | Disc.: Spacewatch || 
|- id="2003 SE430" bgcolor=#E9E9E9
| 1 ||  || MBA-M || 18.57 || data-sort-value="0.81" | 810 m || multiple || 2003–2020 || 17 Oct 2020 || 36 || align=left | Disc.: SpacewatchAlt.: 2020 SQ21 || 
|- id="2003 SL430" bgcolor=#E9E9E9
| 0 ||  || MBA-M || 17.5 || 1.3 km || multiple || 2003–2021 || 06 Jan 2021 || 114 || align=left | Disc.: SpacewatchAlt.: 2009 AX6, 2016 SR81 || 
|- id="2003 SM430" bgcolor=#E9E9E9
| 0 ||  || MBA-M || 18.0 || 1.1 km || multiple || 2003–2020 || 17 Nov 2020 || 85 || align=left | Disc.: SpacewatchAlt.: 2016 WQ27 || 
|- id="2003 SX430" bgcolor=#E9E9E9
| 0 ||  || MBA-M || 18.19 || 1.3 km || multiple || 2003–2021 || 04 Oct 2021 || 150 || align=left | Disc.: SDSSAdded on 19 October 2020 || 
|- id="2003 SM431" bgcolor=#fefefe
| 0 ||  || MBA-I || 18.61 || data-sort-value="0.56" | 560 m || multiple || 2003–2021 || 07 Oct 2021 || 37 || align=left | Disc.: LPL/Spacewatch IIAlt.: 2014 UZ16 || 
|- id="2003 SN431" bgcolor=#fefefe
| 0 ||  || MBA-I || 18.8 || data-sort-value="0.52" | 520 m || multiple || 2002–2020 || 04 Jan 2020 || 46 || align=left | Disc.:  LPL/Spacewatch IIAdded on 17 June 2021 || 
|- id="2003 SU431" bgcolor=#d6d6d6
| 2 ||  || MBA-O || 17.6 || 1.7 km || multiple || 2003–2018 || 13 Sep 2018 || 39 || align=left | Disc.: LPL/Spacewatch II || 
|- id="2003 SV431" bgcolor=#E9E9E9
| 0 ||  || MBA-M || 17.7 || data-sort-value="0.86" | 860 m || multiple || 2003–2020 || 15 Dec 2020 || 62 || align=left | Disc.: LPL/Spacewatch II || 
|- id="2003 SW431" bgcolor=#d6d6d6
| 0 ||  || MBA-O || 16.57 || 2.7 km || multiple || 2003–2021 || 08 Dec 2021 || 127 || align=left | Disc.: NEAT || 
|- id="2003 SZ431" bgcolor=#d6d6d6
| 0 ||  || MBA-O || 16.26 || 3.1 km || multiple || 2003–2021 || 13 May 2021 || 175 || align=left | Disc.: SpacewatchAlt.: 2016 AV262 || 
|- id="2003 SA432" bgcolor=#d6d6d6
| 2 ||  || MBA-O || 17.4 || 1.8 km || multiple || 2003–2019 || 20 Sep 2019 || 29 || align=left | Disc.: Spacewatch || 
|- id="2003 SB432" bgcolor=#E9E9E9
| 1 ||  || MBA-M || 18.94 || data-sort-value="0.68" | 680 m || multiple || 2003–2021 || 30 Nov 2021 || 25 || align=left | Disc.: Spacewatch || 
|- id="2003 SC432" bgcolor=#d6d6d6
| 1 ||  || MBA-O || 17.1 || 2.1 km || multiple || 2003–2020 || 10 Dec 2020 || 75 || align=left | Disc.: SpacewatchAlt.: 2003 UV416 || 
|- id="2003 SF432" bgcolor=#d6d6d6
| 0 ||  || MBA-O || 17.0 || 2.2 km || multiple || 2003–2020 || 23 Nov 2020 || 47 || align=left | Disc.: LPL/Spacewatch IIAlt.: 2009 WV168 || 
|- id="2003 SO432" bgcolor=#d6d6d6
| 1 ||  || MBA-O || 17.3 || 1.9 km || multiple || 2003–2020 || 06 Dec 2020 || 50 || align=left | Disc.: LPL/Spacewatch II || 
|- id="2003 SP432" bgcolor=#E9E9E9
| 1 ||  || MBA-M || 17.9 || 1.1 km || multiple || 2003–2020 || 06 Dec 2020 || 74 || align=left | Disc.: Spacewatch || 
|- id="2003 SR432" bgcolor=#d6d6d6
| 0 ||  || MBA-O || 16.6 || 2.7 km || multiple || 2000–2021 || 11 Jan 2021 || 131 || align=left | Disc.: SpacewatchAlt.: 2014 SG156 || 
|- id="2003 SA433" bgcolor=#E9E9E9
| – ||  || MBA-M || 17.4 || data-sort-value="0.98" | 980 m || single || 32 days || 24 Oct 2003 || 8 || align=left | Disc.: Spacewatch || 
|- id="2003 SB433" bgcolor=#E9E9E9
| 5 ||  || MBA-M || 19.0 || data-sort-value="0.67" | 670 m || multiple || 2003–2020 || 16 Oct 2020 || 25 || align=left | Disc.: LPL/Spacewatch II || 
|- id="2003 SE433" bgcolor=#fefefe
| 0 ||  || MBA-I || 18.3 || data-sort-value="0.65" | 650 m || multiple || 2003–2018 || 11 Jul 2018 || 45 || align=left | Disc.: SDSS || 
|- id="2003 SG433" bgcolor=#d6d6d6
| 0 ||  || MBA-O || 16.7 || 2.5 km || multiple || 2003–2021 || 18 Jan 2021 || 105 || align=left | Disc.: SpacewatchAlt.: 2014 UC12 || 
|- id="2003 SJ433" bgcolor=#d6d6d6
| 0 ||  || MBA-O || 17.01 || 2.2 km || multiple || 2003–2022 || 25 Jan 2022 || 53 || align=left | Disc.: SDSSAlt.: 2014 QK247 || 
|- id="2003 SM433" bgcolor=#d6d6d6
| 0 ||  || MBA-O || 17.1 || 2.1 km || multiple || 2003–2020 || 26 Oct 2020 || 45 || align=left | Disc.: Spacewatch || 
|- id="2003 SR433" bgcolor=#d6d6d6
| 0 ||  || MBA-O || 16.5 || 2.8 km || multiple || 2003–2021 || 07 Jan 2021 || 116 || align=left | Disc.: SpacewatchAlt.: 2014 WG235, 2014 WO561 || 
|- id="2003 ST433" bgcolor=#d6d6d6
| 1 ||  || MBA-O || 17.6 || 1.7 km || multiple || 2003–2021 || 05 Jan 2021 || 30 || align=left | Disc.: SpacewatchAlt.: 2014 RQ9 || 
|- id="2003 SB434" bgcolor=#E9E9E9
| 0 ||  || MBA-M || 17.46 || 1.4 km || multiple || 2003–2021 || 02 Dec 2021 || 96 || align=left | Disc.: SDSSAdded on 22 July 2020 || 
|- id="2003 SE434" bgcolor=#d6d6d6
| 1 ||  || MBA-O || 17.8 || 1.5 km || multiple || 2003–2020 || 26 Jan 2020 || 26 || align=left | Disc.: SDSS || 
|- id="2003 SK434" bgcolor=#E9E9E9
| 1 ||  || MBA-M || 18.29 || 1.2 km || multiple || 2003–2021 || 04 Oct 2021 || 47 || align=left | Disc.: SDSSAlt.: 2017 XQ20 || 
|- id="2003 SN434" bgcolor=#d6d6d6
| 1 ||  || MBA-O || 16.8 || 2.4 km || multiple || 1998–2020 || 23 Jan 2020 || 195 || align=left | Disc.: AMOS || 
|- id="2003 SV434" bgcolor=#E9E9E9
| 1 ||  || MBA-M || 18.60 || data-sort-value="0.80" | 800 m || multiple || 2003–2020 || 08 Oct 2020 || 29 || align=left | Disc.: SDSSAdded on 17 January 2021 || 
|- id="2003 SZ434" bgcolor=#E9E9E9
| 0 ||  || MBA-M || 17.6 || data-sort-value="0.90" | 900 m || multiple || 2003–2020 || 23 Oct 2020 || 65 || align=left | Disc.: SDSSAlt.: 2006 BC195 || 
|- id="2003 SA435" bgcolor=#fefefe
| 0 ||  || HUN || 17.87 || data-sort-value="0.79" | 790 m || multiple || 2002–2021 || 14 Apr 2021 || 138 || align=left | Disc.: NEATAlt.: 2002 GD53 || 
|- id="2003 SD435" bgcolor=#fefefe
| 2 ||  || MBA-I || 19.6 || data-sort-value="0.36" | 360 m || multiple || 2003–2014 || 18 Sep 2014 || 30 || align=left | Disc.: SDSSAlt.: 2003 SM349, 2014 RS54 || 
|- id="2003 SE435" bgcolor=#d6d6d6
| 0 ||  || MBA-O || 16.59 || 2.7 km || multiple || 2003–2022 || 25 Jan 2022 || 102 || align=left | Disc.: Spacewatch || 
|- id="2003 SH435" bgcolor=#FA8072
| 3 ||  || MCA || 19.0 || data-sort-value="0.47" | 470 m || multiple || 2003–2007 || 02 Nov 2007 || 19 || align=left | Disc.: NEAT || 
|- id="2003 SJ435" bgcolor=#fefefe
| 2 ||  || MBA-I || 19.2 || data-sort-value="0.43" | 430 m || multiple || 2003–2020 || 11 Dec 2020 || 37 || align=left | Disc.: NEAT || 
|- id="2003 SK435" bgcolor=#E9E9E9
| 0 ||  || MBA-M || 16.8 || 2.4 km || multiple || 2003–2020 || 12 Apr 2020 || 62 || align=left | Disc.: NEAT || 
|- id="2003 SL435" bgcolor=#fefefe
| 0 ||  || MBA-I || 17.9 || data-sort-value="0.78" | 780 m || multiple || 2003–2021 || 09 Jan 2021 || 110 || align=left | Disc.: NEAT || 
|- id="2003 SM435" bgcolor=#fefefe
| 2 ||  || MBA-I || 18.7 || data-sort-value="0.54" | 540 m || multiple || 2003–2019 || 02 Jan 2019 || 37 || align=left | Disc.: NEAT || 
|- id="2003 SO435" bgcolor=#fefefe
| 1 ||  || MBA-I || 18.1 || data-sort-value="0.71" | 710 m || multiple || 2003–2019 || 05 Feb 2019 || 55 || align=left | Disc.: NEAT || 
|- id="2003 SP435" bgcolor=#d6d6d6
| 0 ||  || MBA-O || 16.7 || 2.5 km || multiple || 2003–2020 || 15 Dec 2020 || 109 || align=left | Disc.: NEAT || 
|- id="2003 SQ435" bgcolor=#E9E9E9
| 0 ||  || MBA-M || 17.4 || data-sort-value="0.98" | 980 m || multiple || 2003–2020 || 26 Dec 2020 || 61 || align=left | Disc.: NEAT || 
|- id="2003 SR435" bgcolor=#fefefe
| 0 ||  || MBA-I || 18.6 || data-sort-value="0.57" | 570 m || multiple || 2003–2019 || 10 Jul 2019 || 73 || align=left | Disc.: LONEOS || 
|- id="2003 ST435" bgcolor=#fefefe
| 0 ||  || MBA-I || 17.89 || data-sort-value="0.79" | 790 m || multiple || 2003–2022 || 04 Jan 2022 || 122 || align=left | Disc.: NEAT || 
|- id="2003 SU435" bgcolor=#fefefe
| 0 ||  || MBA-I || 18.3 || data-sort-value="0.65" | 650 m || multiple || 2003–2021 || 18 Jan 2021 || 79 || align=left | Disc.: NEAT || 
|- id="2003 SV435" bgcolor=#E9E9E9
| 0 ||  || MBA-M || 16.9 || 1.2 km || multiple || 2003–2021 || 15 Jan 2021 || 85 || align=left | Disc.: LONEOS || 
|- id="2003 SW435" bgcolor=#fefefe
| 0 ||  || MBA-I || 18.69 || data-sort-value="0.54" | 540 m || multiple || 2003–2022 || 12 Jan 2022 || 62 || align=left | Disc.: LONEOSAlt.: 2010 SE61 || 
|- id="2003 SX435" bgcolor=#E9E9E9
| 0 ||  || MBA-M || 16.8 || 2.4 km || multiple || 2003–2021 || 12 Jun 2021 || 118 || align=left | Disc.: LONEOS || 
|- id="2003 SY435" bgcolor=#fefefe
| 0 ||  || MBA-I || 18.6 || data-sort-value="0.57" | 570 m || multiple || 2003–2020 || 22 Dec 2020 || 54 || align=left | Disc.: LONEOS || 
|- id="2003 SZ435" bgcolor=#FA8072
| 0 ||  || MCA || 18.0 || data-sort-value="0.75" | 750 m || multiple || 2003–2019 || 24 Oct 2019 || 66 || align=left | Disc.: LONEOS || 
|- id="2003 SA436" bgcolor=#fefefe
| 0 ||  || MBA-I || 18.29 || data-sort-value="0.65" | 650 m || multiple || 2003–2021 || 30 Aug 2021 || 54 || align=left | Disc.: LONEOS || 
|- id="2003 SH436" bgcolor=#fefefe
| 0 ||  || MBA-I || 17.47 || data-sort-value="0.95" | 950 m || multiple || 2003–2021 || 27 Nov 2021 || 187 || align=left | Disc.: Spacewatch || 
|- id="2003 SK436" bgcolor=#fefefe
| 0 ||  || MBA-I || 18.15 || data-sort-value="0.70" | 700 m || multiple || 2003–2022 || 06 Jan 2022 || 167 || align=left | Disc.: Spacewatch || 
|- id="2003 SP436" bgcolor=#fefefe
| 0 ||  || MBA-I || 18.38 || data-sort-value="0.63" | 630 m || multiple || 2003–2021 || 13 May 2021 || 122 || align=left | Disc.: Spacewatch || 
|- id="2003 SU436" bgcolor=#d6d6d6
| 0 ||  || MBA-O || 16.4 || 2.9 km || multiple || 2003–2020 || 15 Dec 2020 || 97 || align=left | Disc.: SDSS || 
|- id="2003 SV436" bgcolor=#E9E9E9
| 0 ||  || MBA-M || 17.1 || 2.1 km || multiple || 2003–2021 || 12 Jun 2021 || 115 || align=left | Disc.: Spacewatch || 
|- id="2003 SZ436" bgcolor=#d6d6d6
| 0 ||  || MBA-O || 16.3 || 3.1 km || multiple || 2003–2020 || 10 Dec 2020 || 90 || align=left | Disc.: NEAT || 
|- id="2003 SA437" bgcolor=#d6d6d6
| 1 ||  || MBA-O || 16.75 || 2.5 km || multiple || 2003–2021 || 02 May 2021 || 107 || align=left | Disc.: Spacewatch || 
|- id="2003 SG437" bgcolor=#fefefe
| 0 ||  || MBA-I || 18.0 || data-sort-value="0.75" | 750 m || multiple || 2003–2020 || 17 Dec 2020 || 109 || align=left | Disc.: Spacewatch || 
|- id="2003 SJ437" bgcolor=#fefefe
| 0 ||  || MBA-I || 18.4 || data-sort-value="0.62" | 620 m || multiple || 2003–2017 || 17 Nov 2017 || 78 || align=left | Disc.: Spacewatch || 
|- id="2003 SK437" bgcolor=#E9E9E9
| 0 ||  || MBA-M || 17.33 || 1.9 km || multiple || 2003–2021 || 26 Oct 2021 || 125 || align=left | Disc.: Spacewatch || 
|- id="2003 SO437" bgcolor=#fefefe
| 0 ||  || MBA-I || 18.2 || data-sort-value="0.68" | 680 m || multiple || 2003–2018 || 17 Nov 2018 || 67 || align=left | Disc.: Spacewatch || 
|- id="2003 SR437" bgcolor=#fefefe
| 0 ||  || MBA-I || 18.68 || data-sort-value="0.55" | 550 m || multiple || 2003–2021 || 31 Aug 2021 || 76 || align=left | Disc.: LPL/Spacewatch II || 
|- id="2003 SU437" bgcolor=#fefefe
| 0 ||  || MBA-I || 18.66 || data-sort-value="0.55" | 550 m || multiple || 2003–2021 || 05 Nov 2021 || 114 || align=left | Disc.: Spacewatch || 
|- id="2003 SW437" bgcolor=#fefefe
| 0 ||  || MBA-I || 18.4 || data-sort-value="0.62" | 620 m || multiple || 2003–2020 || 15 Sep 2020 || 126 || align=left | Disc.: Spacewatch || 
|- id="2003 SY437" bgcolor=#E9E9E9
| 0 ||  || MBA-M || 17.38 || 1.9 km || multiple || 1994–2021 || 07 Aug 2021 || 90 || align=left | Disc.: Spacewatch || 
|- id="2003 SZ437" bgcolor=#fefefe
| 0 ||  || MBA-I || 17.9 || data-sort-value="0.78" | 780 m || multiple || 2003–2021 || 18 Jan 2021 || 99 || align=left | Disc.: Spacewatch || 
|- id="2003 SB438" bgcolor=#d6d6d6
| 0 ||  || MBA-O || 17.1 || 2.1 km || multiple || 2003–2020 || 26 Apr 2020 || 80 || align=left | Disc.: Spacewatch || 
|- id="2003 SC438" bgcolor=#d6d6d6
| 0 ||  || MBA-O || 16.96 || 2.3 km || multiple || 2003–2022 || 24 Jan 2022 || 107 || align=left | Disc.: LPL/Spacewatch II || 
|- id="2003 SD438" bgcolor=#d6d6d6
| 0 ||  || MBA-O || 16.9 || 2.3 km || multiple || 2003–2021 || 11 Jun 2021 || 127 || align=left | Disc.: LPL/Spacewatch II || 
|- id="2003 SE438" bgcolor=#E9E9E9
| 0 ||  || MBA-M || 16.9 || 2.3 km || multiple || 2003–2020 || 27 Feb 2020 || 70 || align=left | Disc.: Spacewatch || 
|- id="2003 SM438" bgcolor=#d6d6d6
| 0 ||  || MBA-O || 16.10 || 3.4 km || multiple || 1995–2021 || 05 Dec 2021 || 140 || align=left | Disc.: Spacewatch || 
|- id="2003 SN438" bgcolor=#E9E9E9
| 0 ||  || MBA-M || 17.58 || data-sort-value="0.91" | 910 m || multiple || 2003–2022 || 25 Jan 2022 || 104 || align=left | Disc.: Spacewatch || 
|- id="2003 SQ438" bgcolor=#d6d6d6
| 0 ||  || MBA-O || 16.4 || 2.9 km || multiple || 2003–2020 || 24 Oct 2020 || 99 || align=left | Disc.: Spacewatch || 
|- id="2003 SS438" bgcolor=#E9E9E9
| 0 ||  || MBA-M || 17.45 || 1.8 km || multiple || 2003–2021 || 13 Sep 2021 || 124 || align=left | Disc.: SDSS || 
|- id="2003 ST438" bgcolor=#E9E9E9
| 0 ||  || MBA-M || 17.22 || 2.0 km || multiple || 2003–2019 || 13 Jan 2019 || 73 || align=left | Disc.: NEAT || 
|- id="2003 SV438" bgcolor=#E9E9E9
| 0 ||  || MBA-M || 17.4 || 1.4 km || multiple || 2003–2020 || 16 Oct 2020 || 95 || align=left | Disc.: SDSS || 
|- id="2003 SW438" bgcolor=#fefefe
| 0 ||  || MBA-I || 18.0 || data-sort-value="0.75" | 750 m || multiple || 2003–2021 || 13 May 2021 || 61 || align=left | Disc.: SDSS || 
|- id="2003 SA439" bgcolor=#E9E9E9
| 0 ||  || MBA-M || 17.43 || 1.8 km || multiple || 2003–2021 || 09 Sep 2021 || 113 || align=left | Disc.: Spacewatch || 
|- id="2003 SB439" bgcolor=#E9E9E9
| 0 ||  || MBA-M || 17.36 || 1.9 km || multiple || 2003–2021 || 10 Aug 2021 || 80 || align=left | Disc.: Spacewatch || 
|- id="2003 SD439" bgcolor=#fefefe
| 0 ||  || MBA-I || 18.39 || data-sort-value="0.62" | 620 m || multiple || 2003–2021 || 05 Nov 2021 || 122 || align=left | Disc.: Spacewatch || 
|- id="2003 SF439" bgcolor=#fefefe
| 0 ||  || MBA-I || 17.8 || data-sort-value="0.82" | 820 m || multiple || 2003–2021 || 16 Jan 2021 || 93 || align=left | Disc.: Spacewatch || 
|- id="2003 SG439" bgcolor=#E9E9E9
| 0 ||  || MBA-M || 18.0 || data-sort-value="0.75" | 750 m || multiple || 2003–2021 || 11 Jan 2021 || 67 || align=left | Disc.: LPL/Spacewatch II || 
|- id="2003 SH439" bgcolor=#fefefe
| 0 ||  || MBA-I || 18.4 || data-sort-value="0.62" | 620 m || multiple || 2003–2021 || 04 Jan 2021 || 65 || align=left | Disc.: LPL/Spacewatch II || 
|- id="2003 SJ439" bgcolor=#fefefe
| 0 ||  || MBA-I || 18.1 || data-sort-value="0.71" | 710 m || multiple || 2003–2020 || 05 Nov 2020 || 98 || align=left | Disc.: Spacewatch || 
|- id="2003 SL439" bgcolor=#E9E9E9
| 0 ||  || MBA-M || 17.43 || 1.4 km || multiple || 2003–2022 || 27 Jan 2022 || 93 || align=left | Disc.: LPL/Spacewatch II || 
|- id="2003 SM439" bgcolor=#d6d6d6
| 0 ||  || MBA-O || 16.69 || 2.6 km || multiple || 2003–2022 || 07 Jan 2022 || 198 || align=left | Disc.: SpacewatchAlt.: 2006 BR168, 2010 BP48 || 
|- id="2003 SP439" bgcolor=#fefefe
| 0 ||  || MBA-I || 18.2 || data-sort-value="0.68" | 680 m || multiple || 2003–2021 || 12 Jan 2021 || 104 || align=left | Disc.: Spacewatch || 
|- id="2003 SQ439" bgcolor=#E9E9E9
| 0 ||  || MBA-M || 17.42 || 1.8 km || multiple || 2003–2021 || 31 Aug 2021 || 74 || align=left | Disc.: Spacewatch || 
|- id="2003 SS439" bgcolor=#fefefe
| 0 ||  || MBA-I || 18.29 || data-sort-value="0.65" | 650 m || multiple || 2003–2021 || 07 Nov 2021 || 130 || align=left | Disc.: SpacewatchAlt.: 2010 JD143 || 
|- id="2003 SU439" bgcolor=#fefefe
| 0 ||  || MBA-I || 17.98 || data-sort-value="0.75" | 750 m || multiple || 1995–2021 || 06 Nov 2021 || 137 || align=left | Disc.: Spacewatch || 
|- id="2003 SV439" bgcolor=#fefefe
| 0 ||  || MBA-I || 18.17 || data-sort-value="0.69" | 690 m || multiple || 2003–2021 || 12 Sep 2021 || 73 || align=left | Disc.: Spacewatch || 
|- id="2003 SW439" bgcolor=#fefefe
| 0 ||  || MBA-I || 18.6 || data-sort-value="0.57" | 570 m || multiple || 2003–2020 || 16 Oct 2020 || 81 || align=left | Disc.: Spacewatch || 
|- id="2003 SX439" bgcolor=#E9E9E9
| 0 ||  || MBA-M || 17.49 || 1.8 km || multiple || 2003–2021 || 23 Oct 2021 || 113 || align=left | Disc.: SDSS || 
|- id="2003 SA440" bgcolor=#E9E9E9
| 0 ||  || MBA-M || 17.3 || 1.9 km || multiple || 2003–2021 || 27 Sep 2021 || 123 || align=left | Disc.: Spacewatch || 
|- id="2003 SC440" bgcolor=#fefefe
| 0 ||  || MBA-I || 18.10 || data-sort-value="0.71" | 710 m || multiple || 2003–2021 || 31 Oct 2021 || 128 || align=left | Disc.: Spacewatch || 
|- id="2003 SE440" bgcolor=#d6d6d6
| 0 ||  || MBA-O || 17.14 || 2.1 km || multiple || 2003–2022 || 27 Jan 2022 || 68 || align=left | Disc.: LPL/Spacewatch II || 
|- id="2003 SF440" bgcolor=#d6d6d6
| 0 ||  || MBA-O || 16.6 || 2.7 km || multiple || 2003–2019 || 26 Nov 2019 || 80 || align=left | Disc.: Spacewatch || 
|- id="2003 SG440" bgcolor=#FA8072
| 0 ||  || MCA || 19.3 || data-sort-value="0.41" | 410 m || multiple || 2003–2019 || 04 Jul 2019 || 58 || align=left | Disc.: Spacewatch || 
|- id="2003 SH440" bgcolor=#fefefe
| 0 ||  || MBA-I || 18.8 || data-sort-value="0.52" | 520 m || multiple || 2003–2018 || 06 Oct 2018 || 49 || align=left | Disc.: Spacewatch || 
|- id="2003 SM440" bgcolor=#d6d6d6
| 0 ||  || MBA-O || 17.38 || 1.9 km || multiple || 2003–2021 || 19 Apr 2021 || 87 || align=left | Disc.: Spacewatch || 
|- id="2003 SN440" bgcolor=#fefefe
| 0 ||  || MBA-I || 18.8 || data-sort-value="0.52" | 520 m || multiple || 2003–2018 || 17 Nov 2018 || 53 || align=left | Disc.: Spacewatch || 
|- id="2003 SO440" bgcolor=#d6d6d6
| 0 ||  || MBA-O || 16.8 || 2.4 km || multiple || 2003–2020 || 10 Nov 2020 || 67 || align=left | Disc.: Mauna Kea Obs. || 
|- id="2003 SP440" bgcolor=#fefefe
| 0 ||  || MBA-I || 18.1 || data-sort-value="0.71" | 710 m || multiple || 2003–2017 || 20 Nov 2017 || 58 || align=left | Disc.: Spacewatch || 
|- id="2003 SQ440" bgcolor=#E9E9E9
| 0 ||  || MBA-M || 17.1 || 2.1 km || multiple || 2003–2020 || 22 Apr 2020 || 76 || align=left | Disc.: Spacewatch || 
|- id="2003 SR440" bgcolor=#E9E9E9
| 0 ||  || MBA-M || 16.5 || 2.8 km || multiple || 2003–2020 || 21 Apr 2020 || 85 || align=left | Disc.: Spacewatch || 
|- id="2003 SS440" bgcolor=#d6d6d6
| 0 ||  || MBA-O || 17.68 || 1.6 km || multiple || 2003–2021 || 14 Jun 2021 || 62 || align=left | Disc.: Spacewatch || 
|- id="2003 ST440" bgcolor=#fefefe
| 0 ||  || MBA-I || 18.67 || data-sort-value="0.55" | 550 m || multiple || 2003–2022 || 25 Jan 2022 || 76 || align=left | Disc.: Spacewatch || 
|- id="2003 SU440" bgcolor=#E9E9E9
| 0 ||  || MBA-M || 17.53 || 1.7 km || multiple || 2003–2021 || 06 Nov 2021 || 56 || align=left | Disc.: SDSS || 
|- id="2003 SV440" bgcolor=#d6d6d6
| 0 ||  || MBA-O || 16.3 || 3.1 km || multiple || 2003–2020 || 20 Oct 2020 || 106 || align=left | Disc.: Spacewatch || 
|- id="2003 SW440" bgcolor=#fefefe
| 0 ||  || MBA-I || 18.0 || data-sort-value="0.75" | 750 m || multiple || 2003–2020 || 07 Sep 2020 || 95 || align=left | Disc.: SDSS || 
|- id="2003 SY440" bgcolor=#E9E9E9
| 0 ||  || MBA-M || 17.8 || data-sort-value="0.82" | 820 m || multiple || 1999–2020 || 05 Nov 2020 || 68 || align=left | Disc.: Spacewatch || 
|- id="2003 SA441" bgcolor=#d6d6d6
| 0 ||  || MBA-O || 16.9 || 2.3 km || multiple || 2003–2021 || 21 Jan 2021 || 53 || align=left | Disc.: SDSS || 
|- id="2003 SB441" bgcolor=#fefefe
| 0 ||  || HUN || 18.47 || data-sort-value="0.60" | 600 m || multiple || 2003–2021 || 12 May 2021 || 112 || align=left | Disc.: Spacewatch || 
|- id="2003 SF441" bgcolor=#E9E9E9
| 0 ||  || MBA-M || 17.3 || 1.5 km || multiple || 2003–2021 || 06 Jan 2021 || 78 || align=left | Disc.: LPL/Spacewatch II || 
|- id="2003 SG441" bgcolor=#E9E9E9
| 0 ||  || MBA-M || 17.71 || 1.2 km || multiple || 2003–2021 || 28 Nov 2021 || 73 || align=left | Disc.: Spacewatch || 
|- id="2003 SH441" bgcolor=#fefefe
| 1 ||  || MBA-I || 18.81 || data-sort-value="0.51" | 510 m || multiple || 2003–2022 || 06 Jan 2022 || 54 || align=left | Disc.: SDSS || 
|- id="2003 SJ441" bgcolor=#fefefe
| 0 ||  || MBA-I || 18.7 || data-sort-value="0.54" | 540 m || multiple || 2003–2019 || 26 Sep 2019 || 63 || align=left | Disc.: Spacewatch || 
|- id="2003 SK441" bgcolor=#d6d6d6
| 0 ||  || MBA-O || 16.5 || 2.8 km || multiple || 2003–2019 || 19 Nov 2019 || 70 || align=left | Disc.: Spacewatch || 
|- id="2003 SM441" bgcolor=#d6d6d6
| 0 ||  || MBA-O || 16.2 || 3.2 km || multiple || 2003–2020 || 25 May 2020 || 62 || align=left | Disc.: LPL/Spacewatch II || 
|- id="2003 SN441" bgcolor=#fefefe
| 0 ||  || MBA-I || 18.7 || data-sort-value="0.54" | 540 m || multiple || 2003–2021 || 07 Jan 2021 || 76 || align=left | Disc.: Spacewatch || 
|- id="2003 SO441" bgcolor=#E9E9E9
| 0 ||  || MBA-M || 17.60 || 1.7 km || multiple || 2003–2021 || 03 Oct 2021 || 112 || align=left | Disc.: Spacewatch || 
|- id="2003 SQ441" bgcolor=#fefefe
| 0 ||  || MBA-I || 18.09 || data-sort-value="0.72" | 720 m || multiple || 2003–2021 || 13 May 2021 || 100 || align=left | Disc.: LPL/Spacewatch II || 
|- id="2003 SS441" bgcolor=#fefefe
| 0 ||  || HUN || 18.1 || data-sort-value="0.71" | 710 m || multiple || 2003–2021 || 29 May 2021 || 104 || align=left | Disc.: NEAT || 
|- id="2003 ST441" bgcolor=#fefefe
| 0 ||  || MBA-I || 18.6 || data-sort-value="0.57" | 570 m || multiple || 2003–2020 || 08 Dec 2020 || 87 || align=left | Disc.: SDSSAlt.: 2015 CA47 || 
|- id="2003 SW441" bgcolor=#d6d6d6
| 0 ||  || MBA-O || 16.5 || 2.8 km || multiple || 2003–2020 || 10 Dec 2020 || 82 || align=left | Disc.: Spacewatch || 
|- id="2003 SY441" bgcolor=#d6d6d6
| 0 ||  || MBA-O || 16.6 || 2.7 km || multiple || 2001–2019 || 24 Oct 2019 || 69 || align=left | Disc.: Spacewatch || 
|- id="2003 SZ441" bgcolor=#d6d6d6
| 0 ||  || MBA-O || 16.4 || 2.9 km || multiple || 2003–2020 || 12 Dec 2020 || 114 || align=left | Disc.: Spacewatch || 
|- id="2003 SA442" bgcolor=#E9E9E9
| 0 ||  || MBA-M || 17.64 || 1.2 km || multiple || 2003–2021 || 28 Nov 2021 || 87 || align=left | Disc.: Spacewatch || 
|- id="2003 SD442" bgcolor=#fefefe
| 0 ||  || MBA-I || 18.5 || data-sort-value="0.59" | 590 m || multiple || 2003–2020 || 17 Dec 2020 || 74 || align=left | Disc.: LPL/Spacewatch II || 
|- id="2003 SE442" bgcolor=#d6d6d6
| 0 ||  || MBA-O || 16.78 || 2.5 km || multiple || 2003–2022 || 27 Jan 2022 || 87 || align=left | Disc.: SDSSAlt.: 2011 CM141 || 
|- id="2003 SF442" bgcolor=#E9E9E9
| 0 ||  || MBA-M || 17.5 || data-sort-value="0.94" | 940 m || multiple || 2003–2020 || 14 Dec 2020 || 65 || align=left | Disc.: SDSS || 
|- id="2003 SH442" bgcolor=#E9E9E9
| 0 ||  || MBA-M || 17.46 || 1.8 km || multiple || 2000–2021 || 30 Oct 2021 || 125 || align=left | Disc.: Spacewatch || 
|- id="2003 SL442" bgcolor=#fefefe
| 0 ||  || MBA-I || 18.3 || data-sort-value="0.65" | 650 m || multiple || 2003–2020 || 18 Dec 2020 || 59 || align=left | Disc.: Spacewatch || 
|- id="2003 SM442" bgcolor=#fefefe
| 0 ||  || MBA-I || 17.96 || data-sort-value="0.76" | 760 m || multiple || 2002–2021 || 12 Sep 2021 || 84 || align=left | Disc.: SDSS || 
|- id="2003 SQ442" bgcolor=#E9E9E9
| 0 ||  || MBA-M || 17.0 || 1.2 km || multiple || 2003–2021 || 16 Jan 2021 || 106 || align=left | Disc.: Spacewatch || 
|- id="2003 SR442" bgcolor=#fefefe
| 0 ||  || MBA-I || 18.8 || data-sort-value="0.52" | 520 m || multiple || 2003–2019 || 28 Aug 2019 || 57 || align=left | Disc.: Spacewatch || 
|- id="2003 SV442" bgcolor=#fefefe
| 0 ||  || MBA-I || 19.00 || data-sort-value="0.47" | 470 m || multiple || 2003–2022 || 27 Jan 2022 || 54 || align=left | Disc.: NEAT || 
|- id="2003 SY442" bgcolor=#E9E9E9
| 0 ||  || MBA-M || 17.96 || 1.1 km || multiple || 2003–2021 || 08 Dec 2021 || 68 || align=left | Disc.: SDSS || 
|- id="2003 SZ442" bgcolor=#d6d6d6
| 0 ||  || MBA-O || 17.15 || 2.1 km || multiple || 2003–2022 || 26 Jan 2022 || 70 || align=left | Disc.: Spacewatch || 
|}
back to top

References 
 

Lists of unnumbered minor planets